

348001–348100 

|-bgcolor=#E9E9E9
| 348001 ||  || — || September 26, 2003 || Desert Eagle || W. K. Y. Yeung || — || align=right | 1.4 km || 
|-id=002 bgcolor=#E9E9E9
| 348002 ||  || — || September 18, 2003 || Kitt Peak || Spacewatch || — || align=right | 1.4 km || 
|-id=003 bgcolor=#fefefe
| 348003 ||  || — || September 26, 2003 || Socorro || LINEAR || NYS || align=right data-sort-value="0.81" | 810 m || 
|-id=004 bgcolor=#E9E9E9
| 348004 ||  || — || September 26, 2003 || Socorro || LINEAR || JUN || align=right | 2.0 km || 
|-id=005 bgcolor=#fefefe
| 348005 ||  || — || September 27, 2003 || Kitt Peak || Spacewatch || — || align=right data-sort-value="0.93" | 930 m || 
|-id=006 bgcolor=#E9E9E9
| 348006 ||  || — || September 28, 2003 || Kitt Peak || Spacewatch || — || align=right | 1.9 km || 
|-id=007 bgcolor=#E9E9E9
| 348007 ||  || — || September 29, 2003 || Socorro || LINEAR || — || align=right | 1.8 km || 
|-id=008 bgcolor=#E9E9E9
| 348008 ||  || — || September 29, 2003 || Socorro || LINEAR || — || align=right | 1.9 km || 
|-id=009 bgcolor=#E9E9E9
| 348009 ||  || — || September 29, 2003 || Kitt Peak || Spacewatch || — || align=right | 1.8 km || 
|-id=010 bgcolor=#fefefe
| 348010 ||  || — || September 21, 2003 || Anderson Mesa || LONEOS || V || align=right data-sort-value="0.80" | 800 m || 
|-id=011 bgcolor=#E9E9E9
| 348011 ||  || — || September 30, 2003 || Socorro || LINEAR || ADE || align=right | 2.5 km || 
|-id=012 bgcolor=#E9E9E9
| 348012 ||  || — || September 28, 2003 || Desert Eagle || W. K. Y. Yeung || — || align=right | 1.6 km || 
|-id=013 bgcolor=#E9E9E9
| 348013 ||  || — || September 29, 2003 || Socorro || LINEAR || — || align=right | 1.5 km || 
|-id=014 bgcolor=#E9E9E9
| 348014 ||  || — || September 17, 2003 || Palomar || NEAT || — || align=right | 1.9 km || 
|-id=015 bgcolor=#d6d6d6
| 348015 ||  || — || September 16, 2003 || Kitt Peak || Spacewatch || — || align=right | 3.5 km || 
|-id=016 bgcolor=#E9E9E9
| 348016 ||  || — || September 18, 2003 || Kitt Peak || Spacewatch || — || align=right | 1.7 km || 
|-id=017 bgcolor=#E9E9E9
| 348017 ||  || — || September 26, 2003 || Apache Point || SDSS || — || align=right | 1.1 km || 
|-id=018 bgcolor=#E9E9E9
| 348018 ||  || — || September 22, 2003 || Kitt Peak || Spacewatch || — || align=right | 1.5 km || 
|-id=019 bgcolor=#E9E9E9
| 348019 ||  || — || September 26, 2003 || Apache Point || SDSS || — || align=right | 1.7 km || 
|-id=020 bgcolor=#E9E9E9
| 348020 ||  || — || September 26, 2003 || Apache Point || SDSS || JUN || align=right data-sort-value="0.93" | 930 m || 
|-id=021 bgcolor=#E9E9E9
| 348021 ||  || — || September 26, 2003 || Apache Point || SDSS || — || align=right data-sort-value="0.96" | 960 m || 
|-id=022 bgcolor=#E9E9E9
| 348022 ||  || — || September 26, 2003 || Apache Point || SDSS || — || align=right | 1.7 km || 
|-id=023 bgcolor=#E9E9E9
| 348023 ||  || — || September 29, 2003 || Kitt Peak || Spacewatch || — || align=right | 1.6 km || 
|-id=024 bgcolor=#E9E9E9
| 348024 ||  || — || October 3, 2003 || Kitt Peak || Spacewatch || — || align=right | 1.9 km || 
|-id=025 bgcolor=#E9E9E9
| 348025 ||  || — || October 1, 2003 || Anderson Mesa || LONEOS || — || align=right | 2.2 km || 
|-id=026 bgcolor=#E9E9E9
| 348026 ||  || — || September 27, 2003 || Socorro || LINEAR || — || align=right | 2.8 km || 
|-id=027 bgcolor=#E9E9E9
| 348027 ||  || — || October 3, 2003 || Haleakala || NEAT || — || align=right | 2.8 km || 
|-id=028 bgcolor=#FA8072
| 348028 ||  || — || October 16, 2003 || Palomar || NEAT || PHO || align=right | 1.2 km || 
|-id=029 bgcolor=#E9E9E9
| 348029 ||  || — || October 16, 2003 || Palomar || NEAT || — || align=right | 2.4 km || 
|-id=030 bgcolor=#E9E9E9
| 348030 ||  || — || October 16, 2003 || Anderson Mesa || LONEOS || — || align=right | 2.1 km || 
|-id=031 bgcolor=#d6d6d6
| 348031 ||  || — || September 22, 2003 || Anderson Mesa || LONEOS || HIL || align=right | 6.2 km || 
|-id=032 bgcolor=#E9E9E9
| 348032 ||  || — || October 21, 2003 || Anderson Mesa || LONEOS || — || align=right | 1.4 km || 
|-id=033 bgcolor=#fefefe
| 348033 ||  || — || October 20, 2003 || Socorro || LINEAR || — || align=right data-sort-value="0.95" | 950 m || 
|-id=034 bgcolor=#E9E9E9
| 348034 Deslorieux ||  ||  || October 24, 2003 || Le Creusot || J.-C. Merlin || JUN || align=right | 1.4 km || 
|-id=035 bgcolor=#d6d6d6
| 348035 ||  || — || October 22, 2003 || Kitt Peak || Spacewatch || — || align=right | 2.9 km || 
|-id=036 bgcolor=#E9E9E9
| 348036 ||  || — || October 16, 2003 || Palomar || NEAT || — || align=right | 2.5 km || 
|-id=037 bgcolor=#d6d6d6
| 348037 ||  || — || October 16, 2003 || Palomar || NEAT || — || align=right | 3.4 km || 
|-id=038 bgcolor=#E9E9E9
| 348038 ||  || — || October 18, 2003 || Palomar || NEAT || — || align=right | 2.3 km || 
|-id=039 bgcolor=#E9E9E9
| 348039 ||  || — || October 17, 2003 || Anderson Mesa || LONEOS || — || align=right | 3.5 km || 
|-id=040 bgcolor=#E9E9E9
| 348040 ||  || — || October 18, 2003 || Palomar || NEAT || — || align=right | 1.7 km || 
|-id=041 bgcolor=#E9E9E9
| 348041 ||  || — || October 20, 2003 || Palomar || NEAT || — || align=right | 1.9 km || 
|-id=042 bgcolor=#E9E9E9
| 348042 ||  || — || September 20, 2003 || Palomar || NEAT || JUN || align=right | 1.4 km || 
|-id=043 bgcolor=#E9E9E9
| 348043 ||  || — || October 21, 2003 || Kitt Peak || Spacewatch || — || align=right | 2.0 km || 
|-id=044 bgcolor=#E9E9E9
| 348044 ||  || — || October 21, 2003 || Socorro || LINEAR || — || align=right | 2.1 km || 
|-id=045 bgcolor=#E9E9E9
| 348045 ||  || — || October 21, 2003 || Socorro || LINEAR || — || align=right | 1.9 km || 
|-id=046 bgcolor=#E9E9E9
| 348046 ||  || — || October 18, 2003 || Anderson Mesa || LONEOS || — || align=right | 1.5 km || 
|-id=047 bgcolor=#E9E9E9
| 348047 ||  || — || October 18, 2003 || Kitt Peak || Spacewatch || — || align=right | 1.8 km || 
|-id=048 bgcolor=#E9E9E9
| 348048 ||  || — || October 20, 2003 || Kitt Peak || Spacewatch || — || align=right | 2.2 km || 
|-id=049 bgcolor=#E9E9E9
| 348049 ||  || — || October 20, 2003 || Socorro || LINEAR || RAF || align=right | 1.1 km || 
|-id=050 bgcolor=#d6d6d6
| 348050 ||  || — || October 21, 2003 || Palomar || NEAT || — || align=right | 4.8 km || 
|-id=051 bgcolor=#E9E9E9
| 348051 ||  || — || October 21, 2003 || Palomar || NEAT || — || align=right | 2.0 km || 
|-id=052 bgcolor=#fefefe
| 348052 ||  || — || October 22, 2003 || Socorro || LINEAR || — || align=right | 1.0 km || 
|-id=053 bgcolor=#FA8072
| 348053 ||  || — || October 22, 2003 || Socorro || LINEAR || — || align=right data-sort-value="0.81" | 810 m || 
|-id=054 bgcolor=#E9E9E9
| 348054 ||  || — || October 22, 2003 || Kitt Peak || Spacewatch || — || align=right | 3.7 km || 
|-id=055 bgcolor=#E9E9E9
| 348055 ||  || — || October 24, 2003 || Socorro || LINEAR || — || align=right | 3.6 km || 
|-id=056 bgcolor=#E9E9E9
| 348056 ||  || — || October 23, 2003 || Anderson Mesa || LONEOS || JUN || align=right | 1.1 km || 
|-id=057 bgcolor=#E9E9E9
| 348057 ||  || — || October 21, 2003 || Kitt Peak || Spacewatch || HNS || align=right | 1.7 km || 
|-id=058 bgcolor=#d6d6d6
| 348058 ||  || — || October 22, 2003 || Kitt Peak || Spacewatch || — || align=right | 3.1 km || 
|-id=059 bgcolor=#E9E9E9
| 348059 ||  || — || October 22, 2003 || Haleakala || NEAT || ADE || align=right | 2.5 km || 
|-id=060 bgcolor=#E9E9E9
| 348060 ||  || — || October 25, 2003 || Socorro || LINEAR || — || align=right | 2.8 km || 
|-id=061 bgcolor=#E9E9E9
| 348061 ||  || — || October 16, 2003 || Anderson Mesa || LONEOS || — || align=right | 2.1 km || 
|-id=062 bgcolor=#E9E9E9
| 348062 ||  || — || October 30, 2003 || Haleakala || NEAT || — || align=right | 3.0 km || 
|-id=063 bgcolor=#d6d6d6
| 348063 ||  || — || October 29, 2003 || Catalina || CSS || — || align=right | 3.7 km || 
|-id=064 bgcolor=#E9E9E9
| 348064 ||  || — || October 28, 2003 || Socorro || LINEAR || — || align=right | 2.0 km || 
|-id=065 bgcolor=#E9E9E9
| 348065 ||  || — || October 16, 2003 || Kitt Peak || Spacewatch || — || align=right | 1.2 km || 
|-id=066 bgcolor=#E9E9E9
| 348066 ||  || — || October 17, 2003 || Kitt Peak || Spacewatch || — || align=right | 2.1 km || 
|-id=067 bgcolor=#E9E9E9
| 348067 ||  || — || October 21, 2003 || Palomar || NEAT || JUN || align=right | 1.4 km || 
|-id=068 bgcolor=#E9E9E9
| 348068 ||  || — || July 3, 2003 || Kitt Peak || Spacewatch || MAR || align=right data-sort-value="0.99" | 990 m || 
|-id=069 bgcolor=#E9E9E9
| 348069 ||  || — || October 22, 2003 || Apache Point || SDSS || — || align=right | 1.5 km || 
|-id=070 bgcolor=#E9E9E9
| 348070 ||  || — || October 23, 2003 || Apache Point || SDSS || GAL || align=right | 1.9 km || 
|-id=071 bgcolor=#d6d6d6
| 348071 ||  || — || November 16, 2003 || Catalina || CSS || — || align=right | 4.0 km || 
|-id=072 bgcolor=#d6d6d6
| 348072 ||  || — || November 18, 2003 || Palomar || NEAT || EOS || align=right | 2.9 km || 
|-id=073 bgcolor=#FA8072
| 348073 ||  || — || November 20, 2003 || Palomar || NEAT || — || align=right | 1.8 km || 
|-id=074 bgcolor=#fefefe
| 348074 ||  || — || November 22, 2003 || Socorro || LINEAR || PHO || align=right | 2.6 km || 
|-id=075 bgcolor=#E9E9E9
| 348075 ||  || — || November 19, 2003 || Socorro || LINEAR || — || align=right | 2.6 km || 
|-id=076 bgcolor=#E9E9E9
| 348076 ||  || — || November 19, 2003 || Kitt Peak || Spacewatch || JUN || align=right | 1.1 km || 
|-id=077 bgcolor=#E9E9E9
| 348077 ||  || — || November 19, 2003 || Kitt Peak || Spacewatch || — || align=right | 2.3 km || 
|-id=078 bgcolor=#E9E9E9
| 348078 ||  || — || November 19, 2003 || Kitt Peak || Spacewatch || EUN || align=right | 1.7 km || 
|-id=079 bgcolor=#E9E9E9
| 348079 ||  || — || November 19, 2003 || Socorro || LINEAR || — || align=right | 1.9 km || 
|-id=080 bgcolor=#E9E9E9
| 348080 ||  || — || November 18, 2003 || Kitt Peak || Spacewatch || — || align=right | 1.5 km || 
|-id=081 bgcolor=#E9E9E9
| 348081 ||  || — || November 20, 2003 || Socorro || LINEAR || — || align=right | 2.1 km || 
|-id=082 bgcolor=#E9E9E9
| 348082 ||  || — || November 21, 2003 || Palomar || NEAT || EUN || align=right | 1.7 km || 
|-id=083 bgcolor=#E9E9E9
| 348083 ||  || — || November 19, 2003 || Anderson Mesa || LONEOS || — || align=right | 3.2 km || 
|-id=084 bgcolor=#E9E9E9
| 348084 ||  || — || October 25, 2003 || Kitt Peak || Spacewatch || HOF || align=right | 3.5 km || 
|-id=085 bgcolor=#E9E9E9
| 348085 ||  || — || November 20, 2003 || Socorro || LINEAR || — || align=right | 2.8 km || 
|-id=086 bgcolor=#E9E9E9
| 348086 ||  || — || November 21, 2003 || Catalina || CSS || — || align=right | 2.3 km || 
|-id=087 bgcolor=#E9E9E9
| 348087 ||  || — || November 20, 2003 || Socorro || LINEAR || MAR || align=right | 1.3 km || 
|-id=088 bgcolor=#E9E9E9
| 348088 ||  || — || November 20, 2003 || Socorro || LINEAR || — || align=right | 1.9 km || 
|-id=089 bgcolor=#E9E9E9
| 348089 ||  || — || November 20, 2003 || Socorro || LINEAR || — || align=right | 4.2 km || 
|-id=090 bgcolor=#E9E9E9
| 348090 ||  || — || November 21, 2003 || Socorro || LINEAR || — || align=right | 3.2 km || 
|-id=091 bgcolor=#E9E9E9
| 348091 ||  || — || November 26, 2003 || Kitt Peak || Spacewatch || — || align=right | 2.7 km || 
|-id=092 bgcolor=#E9E9E9
| 348092 ||  || — || November 28, 2003 || Kitt Peak || Spacewatch || — || align=right | 1.7 km || 
|-id=093 bgcolor=#E9E9E9
| 348093 ||  || — || November 30, 2003 || Kitt Peak || Spacewatch || BRU || align=right | 2.8 km || 
|-id=094 bgcolor=#E9E9E9
| 348094 ||  || — || November 19, 2003 || Kitt Peak || Spacewatch || — || align=right | 2.0 km || 
|-id=095 bgcolor=#E9E9E9
| 348095 ||  || — || November 24, 2003 || Kitt Peak || M. W. Buie || — || align=right | 1.9 km || 
|-id=096 bgcolor=#E9E9E9
| 348096 ||  || — || December 14, 2003 || Črni Vrh || Črni Vrh || — || align=right | 2.2 km || 
|-id=097 bgcolor=#E9E9E9
| 348097 ||  || — || December 14, 2003 || Kitt Peak || Spacewatch || INO || align=right | 1.3 km || 
|-id=098 bgcolor=#E9E9E9
| 348098 ||  || — || December 3, 2003 || Socorro || LINEAR || EUN || align=right | 1.5 km || 
|-id=099 bgcolor=#E9E9E9
| 348099 ||  || — || December 16, 2003 || Catalina || CSS || — || align=right | 3.0 km || 
|-id=100 bgcolor=#d6d6d6
| 348100 ||  || — || December 17, 2003 || Socorro || LINEAR || — || align=right | 3.5 km || 
|}

348101–348200 

|-bgcolor=#E9E9E9
| 348101 ||  || — || December 17, 2003 || Socorro || LINEAR || — || align=right | 2.7 km || 
|-id=102 bgcolor=#E9E9E9
| 348102 ||  || — || December 17, 2003 || Palomar || NEAT || EUN || align=right | 1.9 km || 
|-id=103 bgcolor=#E9E9E9
| 348103 ||  || — || December 18, 2003 || Haleakala || NEAT || — || align=right | 2.9 km || 
|-id=104 bgcolor=#E9E9E9
| 348104 ||  || — || December 19, 2003 || Socorro || LINEAR || — || align=right | 2.1 km || 
|-id=105 bgcolor=#E9E9E9
| 348105 ||  || — || December 19, 2003 || Kitt Peak || Spacewatch || AST || align=right | 1.8 km || 
|-id=106 bgcolor=#E9E9E9
| 348106 ||  || — || December 19, 2003 || Kitt Peak || Spacewatch || WIT || align=right | 1.3 km || 
|-id=107 bgcolor=#E9E9E9
| 348107 ||  || — || December 19, 2003 || Socorro || LINEAR || — || align=right | 2.0 km || 
|-id=108 bgcolor=#E9E9E9
| 348108 ||  || — || December 19, 2003 || Socorro || LINEAR || — || align=right | 2.7 km || 
|-id=109 bgcolor=#E9E9E9
| 348109 ||  || — || December 20, 2003 || Socorro || LINEAR || — || align=right | 2.9 km || 
|-id=110 bgcolor=#E9E9E9
| 348110 ||  || — || December 23, 2003 || Socorro || LINEAR || — || align=right | 1.9 km || 
|-id=111 bgcolor=#E9E9E9
| 348111 ||  || — || December 27, 2003 || Socorro || LINEAR || — || align=right | 1.6 km || 
|-id=112 bgcolor=#E9E9E9
| 348112 ||  || — || December 27, 2003 || Socorro || LINEAR || — || align=right | 2.5 km || 
|-id=113 bgcolor=#E9E9E9
| 348113 ||  || — || December 28, 2003 || Socorro || LINEAR || — || align=right | 2.6 km || 
|-id=114 bgcolor=#E9E9E9
| 348114 ||  || — || December 27, 2003 || Socorro || LINEAR || HNS || align=right | 1.6 km || 
|-id=115 bgcolor=#E9E9E9
| 348115 ||  || — || December 28, 2003 || Socorro || LINEAR || GEF || align=right | 1.4 km || 
|-id=116 bgcolor=#E9E9E9
| 348116 ||  || — || December 29, 2003 || Catalina || CSS || — || align=right | 2.5 km || 
|-id=117 bgcolor=#E9E9E9
| 348117 ||  || — || December 29, 2003 || Socorro || LINEAR || — || align=right | 2.7 km || 
|-id=118 bgcolor=#d6d6d6
| 348118 ||  || — || December 18, 2003 || Kitt Peak || Spacewatch || EOS || align=right | 2.2 km || 
|-id=119 bgcolor=#E9E9E9
| 348119 ||  || — || December 18, 2003 || Kitt Peak || Spacewatch || — || align=right | 2.5 km || 
|-id=120 bgcolor=#E9E9E9
| 348120 ||  || — || January 13, 2004 || Kitt Peak || Spacewatch || — || align=right | 3.2 km || 
|-id=121 bgcolor=#E9E9E9
| 348121 ||  || — || December 19, 2003 || Kitt Peak || Spacewatch || — || align=right | 2.4 km || 
|-id=122 bgcolor=#E9E9E9
| 348122 ||  || — || January 13, 2004 || Palomar || NEAT || — || align=right | 2.1 km || 
|-id=123 bgcolor=#E9E9E9
| 348123 ||  || — || January 16, 2004 || Kitt Peak || Spacewatch || GEF || align=right | 1.3 km || 
|-id=124 bgcolor=#E9E9E9
| 348124 ||  || — || January 16, 2004 || Palomar || NEAT || — || align=right | 1.5 km || 
|-id=125 bgcolor=#E9E9E9
| 348125 ||  || — || January 17, 2004 || Palomar || NEAT || — || align=right | 3.1 km || 
|-id=126 bgcolor=#E9E9E9
| 348126 ||  || — || January 16, 2004 || Palomar || NEAT || — || align=right | 2.5 km || 
|-id=127 bgcolor=#E9E9E9
| 348127 ||  || — || January 18, 2004 || Palomar || NEAT || — || align=right | 4.9 km || 
|-id=128 bgcolor=#E9E9E9
| 348128 ||  || — || January 19, 2004 || Catalina || CSS || — || align=right | 2.8 km || 
|-id=129 bgcolor=#E9E9E9
| 348129 ||  || — || January 21, 2004 || Socorro || LINEAR || — || align=right | 2.1 km || 
|-id=130 bgcolor=#E9E9E9
| 348130 ||  || — || January 24, 2004 || Socorro || LINEAR || — || align=right | 2.9 km || 
|-id=131 bgcolor=#E9E9E9
| 348131 ||  || — || January 23, 2004 || Socorro || LINEAR || — || align=right | 3.1 km || 
|-id=132 bgcolor=#E9E9E9
| 348132 ||  || — || January 25, 2004 || Haleakala || NEAT || ADE || align=right | 3.0 km || 
|-id=133 bgcolor=#E9E9E9
| 348133 ||  || — || January 24, 2004 || Socorro || LINEAR || — || align=right | 2.4 km || 
|-id=134 bgcolor=#E9E9E9
| 348134 ||  || — || January 26, 2004 || Anderson Mesa || LONEOS || AEO || align=right | 1.4 km || 
|-id=135 bgcolor=#E9E9E9
| 348135 ||  || — || January 28, 2004 || Kitt Peak || Spacewatch || — || align=right | 4.3 km || 
|-id=136 bgcolor=#E9E9E9
| 348136 ||  || — || January 17, 2004 || Palomar || NEAT || — || align=right | 3.4 km || 
|-id=137 bgcolor=#E9E9E9
| 348137 ||  || — || January 19, 2004 || Kitt Peak || Spacewatch || — || align=right | 2.1 km || 
|-id=138 bgcolor=#E9E9E9
| 348138 ||  || — || January 19, 2004 || Socorro || LINEAR || — || align=right | 2.6 km || 
|-id=139 bgcolor=#E9E9E9
| 348139 ||  || — || January 18, 2004 || Palomar || NEAT || — || align=right | 3.1 km || 
|-id=140 bgcolor=#d6d6d6
| 348140 ||  || — || February 11, 2004 || Palomar || NEAT || BRA || align=right | 2.3 km || 
|-id=141 bgcolor=#d6d6d6
| 348141 ||  || — || February 11, 2004 || Kitt Peak || Spacewatch || KOR || align=right | 1.4 km || 
|-id=142 bgcolor=#d6d6d6
| 348142 ||  || — || January 17, 2004 || Palomar || NEAT || — || align=right | 2.7 km || 
|-id=143 bgcolor=#E9E9E9
| 348143 ||  || — || February 12, 2004 || Kitt Peak || Spacewatch || — || align=right | 2.6 km || 
|-id=144 bgcolor=#E9E9E9
| 348144 ||  || — || February 12, 2004 || Palomar || NEAT || — || align=right | 2.7 km || 
|-id=145 bgcolor=#fefefe
| 348145 ||  || — || February 14, 2004 || Haleakala || NEAT || ERI || align=right | 1.8 km || 
|-id=146 bgcolor=#d6d6d6
| 348146 ||  || — || February 11, 2004 || Kitt Peak || Spacewatch || — || align=right | 3.5 km || 
|-id=147 bgcolor=#fefefe
| 348147 ||  || — || February 13, 2004 || Kitt Peak || Spacewatch || — || align=right data-sort-value="0.93" | 930 m || 
|-id=148 bgcolor=#E9E9E9
| 348148 ||  || — || January 19, 2004 || Kitt Peak || Spacewatch || — || align=right | 1.9 km || 
|-id=149 bgcolor=#E9E9E9
| 348149 ||  || — || February 19, 2004 || Socorro || LINEAR || INO || align=right | 1.4 km || 
|-id=150 bgcolor=#d6d6d6
| 348150 ||  || — || February 23, 2004 || Socorro || LINEAR || 3:2 || align=right | 6.1 km || 
|-id=151 bgcolor=#fefefe
| 348151 ||  || — || March 26, 2004 || Kitt Peak || DLS || — || align=right data-sort-value="0.67" | 670 m || 
|-id=152 bgcolor=#d6d6d6
| 348152 ||  || — || March 27, 2004 || Catalina || CSS || BRA || align=right | 2.3 km || 
|-id=153 bgcolor=#fefefe
| 348153 ||  || — || April 12, 2004 || Kitt Peak || Spacewatch || V || align=right data-sort-value="0.74" | 740 m || 
|-id=154 bgcolor=#d6d6d6
| 348154 ||  || — || April 12, 2004 || Socorro || LINEAR || EUP || align=right | 4.6 km || 
|-id=155 bgcolor=#d6d6d6
| 348155 ||  || — || April 10, 2004 || Palomar || NEAT || — || align=right | 4.6 km || 
|-id=156 bgcolor=#d6d6d6
| 348156 ||  || — || April 14, 2004 || Kitt Peak || Spacewatch || — || align=right | 3.7 km || 
|-id=157 bgcolor=#d6d6d6
| 348157 ||  || — || April 15, 2004 || Socorro || LINEAR || TIR || align=right | 4.3 km || 
|-id=158 bgcolor=#E9E9E9
| 348158 ||  || — || April 20, 2004 || Desert Eagle || W. K. Y. Yeung || ADE || align=right | 2.6 km || 
|-id=159 bgcolor=#fefefe
| 348159 ||  || — || April 19, 2004 || Socorro || LINEAR || MAS || align=right data-sort-value="0.99" | 990 m || 
|-id=160 bgcolor=#fefefe
| 348160 ||  || — || April 21, 2004 || Kitt Peak || Spacewatch || — || align=right data-sort-value="0.85" | 850 m || 
|-id=161 bgcolor=#d6d6d6
| 348161 ||  || — || April 21, 2004 || Socorro || LINEAR || — || align=right | 2.8 km || 
|-id=162 bgcolor=#d6d6d6
| 348162 ||  || — || April 24, 2004 || Socorro || LINEAR || — || align=right | 2.9 km || 
|-id=163 bgcolor=#fefefe
| 348163 ||  || — || April 24, 2004 || Kitt Peak || Spacewatch || — || align=right data-sort-value="0.96" | 960 m || 
|-id=164 bgcolor=#d6d6d6
| 348164 ||  || — || April 22, 2004 || Kitt Peak || Spacewatch || TIR || align=right | 3.8 km || 
|-id=165 bgcolor=#d6d6d6
| 348165 ||  || — || May 10, 2004 || Kitt Peak || Spacewatch || VER || align=right | 3.0 km || 
|-id=166 bgcolor=#d6d6d6
| 348166 ||  || — || April 20, 2004 || Socorro || LINEAR || URS || align=right | 4.6 km || 
|-id=167 bgcolor=#fefefe
| 348167 ||  || — || May 15, 2004 || Socorro || LINEAR || — || align=right data-sort-value="0.98" | 980 m || 
|-id=168 bgcolor=#fefefe
| 348168 ||  || — || May 15, 2004 || Socorro || LINEAR || — || align=right data-sort-value="0.76" | 760 m || 
|-id=169 bgcolor=#fefefe
| 348169 ||  || — || May 15, 2004 || Socorro || LINEAR || PHO || align=right | 2.8 km || 
|-id=170 bgcolor=#fefefe
| 348170 ||  || — || May 15, 2004 || Socorro || LINEAR || ERI || align=right | 1.3 km || 
|-id=171 bgcolor=#d6d6d6
| 348171 ||  || — || June 13, 2004 || Catalina || CSS || — || align=right | 4.9 km || 
|-id=172 bgcolor=#fefefe
| 348172 ||  || — || June 29, 2004 || Wrightwood || J. W. Young || NYS || align=right data-sort-value="0.61" | 610 m || 
|-id=173 bgcolor=#d6d6d6
| 348173 ||  || — || July 11, 2004 || Palomar || NEAT || LIX || align=right | 5.4 km || 
|-id=174 bgcolor=#d6d6d6
| 348174 ||  || — || July 14, 2004 || Socorro || LINEAR || — || align=right | 2.6 km || 
|-id=175 bgcolor=#fefefe
| 348175 ||  || — || July 9, 2004 || Siding Spring || SSS || — || align=right data-sort-value="0.87" | 870 m || 
|-id=176 bgcolor=#fefefe
| 348176 ||  || — || July 11, 2004 || Socorro || LINEAR || ERI || align=right | 1.8 km || 
|-id=177 bgcolor=#fefefe
| 348177 ||  || — || July 13, 2004 || Palomar || NEAT || ERI || align=right | 1.8 km || 
|-id=178 bgcolor=#fefefe
| 348178 ||  || — || July 20, 2004 || Reedy Creek || J. Broughton || V || align=right | 1.0 km || 
|-id=179 bgcolor=#fefefe
| 348179 ||  || — || July 29, 2004 || Siding Spring || SSS || PHO || align=right | 1.0 km || 
|-id=180 bgcolor=#fefefe
| 348180 ||  || — || August 7, 2004 || Campo Imperatore || CINEOS || — || align=right data-sort-value="0.99" | 990 m || 
|-id=181 bgcolor=#fefefe
| 348181 ||  || — || August 6, 2004 || Palomar || NEAT || — || align=right | 1.0 km || 
|-id=182 bgcolor=#fefefe
| 348182 ||  || — || August 7, 2004 || Palomar || NEAT || — || align=right data-sort-value="0.98" | 980 m || 
|-id=183 bgcolor=#fefefe
| 348183 ||  || — || August 8, 2004 || Socorro || LINEAR || — || align=right | 1.1 km || 
|-id=184 bgcolor=#fefefe
| 348184 ||  || — || August 8, 2004 || Socorro || LINEAR || — || align=right | 1.5 km || 
|-id=185 bgcolor=#fefefe
| 348185 ||  || — || August 7, 2004 || Campo Imperatore || CINEOS || — || align=right | 1.1 km || 
|-id=186 bgcolor=#fefefe
| 348186 ||  || — || August 8, 2004 || Anderson Mesa || LONEOS || NYS || align=right data-sort-value="0.81" | 810 m || 
|-id=187 bgcolor=#fefefe
| 348187 ||  || — || August 9, 2004 || Socorro || LINEAR || — || align=right | 1.2 km || 
|-id=188 bgcolor=#fefefe
| 348188 ||  || — || August 9, 2004 || Socorro || LINEAR || V || align=right data-sort-value="0.85" | 850 m || 
|-id=189 bgcolor=#fefefe
| 348189 ||  || — || August 10, 2004 || Socorro || LINEAR || NYS || align=right data-sort-value="0.87" | 870 m || 
|-id=190 bgcolor=#d6d6d6
| 348190 ||  || — || August 8, 2004 || Socorro || LINEAR || Tj (2.96) || align=right | 5.1 km || 
|-id=191 bgcolor=#fefefe
| 348191 ||  || — || August 8, 2004 || Socorro || LINEAR || — || align=right data-sort-value="0.99" | 990 m || 
|-id=192 bgcolor=#fefefe
| 348192 ||  || — || August 11, 2004 || Palomar || NEAT || FLO || align=right data-sort-value="0.75" | 750 m || 
|-id=193 bgcolor=#fefefe
| 348193 ||  || — || August 9, 2004 || Anderson Mesa || LONEOS || NYS || align=right data-sort-value="0.76" | 760 m || 
|-id=194 bgcolor=#d6d6d6
| 348194 ||  || — || August 21, 2004 || Siding Spring || SSS || — || align=right | 3.6 km || 
|-id=195 bgcolor=#fefefe
| 348195 ||  || — || August 21, 2004 || Catalina || CSS || — || align=right data-sort-value="0.79" | 790 m || 
|-id=196 bgcolor=#E9E9E9
| 348196 ||  || — || August 21, 2004 || Catalina || CSS || — || align=right | 2.4 km || 
|-id=197 bgcolor=#fefefe
| 348197 ||  || — || August 27, 2004 || Anderson Mesa || LONEOS || V || align=right data-sort-value="0.96" | 960 m || 
|-id=198 bgcolor=#fefefe
| 348198 ||  || — || September 6, 2004 || Palomar || NEAT || NYS || align=right data-sort-value="0.72" | 720 m || 
|-id=199 bgcolor=#fefefe
| 348199 ||  || — || September 6, 2004 || Palomar || NEAT || MAS || align=right data-sort-value="0.64" | 640 m || 
|-id=200 bgcolor=#fefefe
| 348200 ||  || — || September 7, 2004 || Socorro || LINEAR || — || align=right data-sort-value="0.99" | 990 m || 
|}

348201–348300 

|-bgcolor=#fefefe
| 348201 ||  || — || September 7, 2004 || Socorro || LINEAR || ERI || align=right | 1.9 km || 
|-id=202 bgcolor=#fefefe
| 348202 ||  || — || September 7, 2004 || Socorro || LINEAR || — || align=right data-sort-value="0.94" | 940 m || 
|-id=203 bgcolor=#fefefe
| 348203 ||  || — || September 7, 2004 || Kitt Peak || Spacewatch || MAS || align=right data-sort-value="0.86" | 860 m || 
|-id=204 bgcolor=#fefefe
| 348204 ||  || — || September 7, 2004 || Palomar || NEAT || — || align=right | 3.0 km || 
|-id=205 bgcolor=#E9E9E9
| 348205 ||  || — || September 8, 2004 || Campo Imperatore || CINEOS || — || align=right data-sort-value="0.98" | 980 m || 
|-id=206 bgcolor=#fefefe
| 348206 ||  || — || September 8, 2004 || Socorro || LINEAR || — || align=right | 1.3 km || 
|-id=207 bgcolor=#E9E9E9
| 348207 ||  || — || September 8, 2004 || Socorro || LINEAR || XIZ || align=right | 1.6 km || 
|-id=208 bgcolor=#fefefe
| 348208 ||  || — || September 8, 2004 || Socorro || LINEAR || NYS || align=right data-sort-value="0.69" | 690 m || 
|-id=209 bgcolor=#d6d6d6
| 348209 ||  || — || July 13, 2004 || Palomar || NEAT || THB || align=right | 3.1 km || 
|-id=210 bgcolor=#fefefe
| 348210 ||  || — || September 8, 2004 || Socorro || LINEAR || MAS || align=right data-sort-value="0.86" | 860 m || 
|-id=211 bgcolor=#fefefe
| 348211 ||  || — || September 8, 2004 || Socorro || LINEAR || NYS || align=right | 1.0 km || 
|-id=212 bgcolor=#fefefe
| 348212 ||  || — || September 8, 2004 || Socorro || LINEAR || — || align=right | 1.4 km || 
|-id=213 bgcolor=#fefefe
| 348213 ||  || — || September 8, 2004 || Socorro || LINEAR || MAS || align=right data-sort-value="0.77" | 770 m || 
|-id=214 bgcolor=#fefefe
| 348214 ||  || — || September 9, 2004 || Socorro || LINEAR || MAS || align=right data-sort-value="0.85" | 850 m || 
|-id=215 bgcolor=#fefefe
| 348215 ||  || — || September 8, 2004 || Socorro || LINEAR || V || align=right data-sort-value="0.75" | 750 m || 
|-id=216 bgcolor=#E9E9E9
| 348216 ||  || — || September 8, 2004 || Palomar || NEAT || GEF || align=right | 2.1 km || 
|-id=217 bgcolor=#E9E9E9
| 348217 ||  || — || September 8, 2004 || Socorro || LINEAR || — || align=right | 1.4 km || 
|-id=218 bgcolor=#fefefe
| 348218 ||  || — || September 12, 2004 || Socorro || LINEAR || SVE || align=right | 2.3 km || 
|-id=219 bgcolor=#fefefe
| 348219 ||  || — || September 7, 2004 || Kitt Peak || Spacewatch || — || align=right data-sort-value="0.95" | 950 m || 
|-id=220 bgcolor=#fefefe
| 348220 ||  || — || September 9, 2004 || Socorro || LINEAR || V || align=right data-sort-value="0.62" | 620 m || 
|-id=221 bgcolor=#fefefe
| 348221 ||  || — || September 9, 2004 || Kitt Peak || Spacewatch || — || align=right data-sort-value="0.97" | 970 m || 
|-id=222 bgcolor=#fefefe
| 348222 ||  || — || September 8, 2004 || Palomar || NEAT || — || align=right | 1.1 km || 
|-id=223 bgcolor=#fefefe
| 348223 ||  || — || September 10, 2004 || Socorro || LINEAR || V || align=right data-sort-value="0.99" | 990 m || 
|-id=224 bgcolor=#fefefe
| 348224 ||  || — || September 10, 2004 || Socorro || LINEAR || — || align=right | 1.3 km || 
|-id=225 bgcolor=#fefefe
| 348225 ||  || — || September 10, 2004 || Socorro || LINEAR || — || align=right | 1.3 km || 
|-id=226 bgcolor=#E9E9E9
| 348226 ||  || — || September 12, 2004 || Socorro || LINEAR || GAL || align=right | 2.0 km || 
|-id=227 bgcolor=#fefefe
| 348227 ||  || — || September 9, 2004 || Kitt Peak || Spacewatch || MAS || align=right data-sort-value="0.87" | 870 m || 
|-id=228 bgcolor=#fefefe
| 348228 ||  || — || September 11, 2004 || Socorro || LINEAR || H || align=right data-sort-value="0.75" | 750 m || 
|-id=229 bgcolor=#fefefe
| 348229 ||  || — || September 10, 2004 || Kitt Peak || Spacewatch || — || align=right | 1.0 km || 
|-id=230 bgcolor=#fefefe
| 348230 ||  || — || September 15, 2004 || Kitt Peak || Spacewatch || — || align=right data-sort-value="0.98" | 980 m || 
|-id=231 bgcolor=#fefefe
| 348231 ||  || — || September 12, 2004 || Kitt Peak || Spacewatch || — || align=right | 1.0 km || 
|-id=232 bgcolor=#fefefe
| 348232 ||  || — || September 13, 2004 || Socorro || LINEAR || V || align=right data-sort-value="0.64" | 640 m || 
|-id=233 bgcolor=#fefefe
| 348233 ||  || — || September 15, 2004 || Kitt Peak || Spacewatch || — || align=right data-sort-value="0.96" | 960 m || 
|-id=234 bgcolor=#fefefe
| 348234 ||  || — || September 15, 2004 || Kitt Peak || Spacewatch || — || align=right data-sort-value="0.79" | 790 m || 
|-id=235 bgcolor=#fefefe
| 348235 ||  || — || September 15, 2004 || Kitt Peak || Spacewatch || NYS || align=right data-sort-value="0.69" | 690 m || 
|-id=236 bgcolor=#d6d6d6
| 348236 ||  || — || September 18, 2004 || Socorro || LINEAR || — || align=right | 4.4 km || 
|-id=237 bgcolor=#fefefe
| 348237 ||  || — || September 17, 2004 || Socorro || LINEAR || — || align=right | 1.3 km || 
|-id=238 bgcolor=#E9E9E9
| 348238 ||  || — || September 17, 2004 || Anderson Mesa || LONEOS || — || align=right | 3.9 km || 
|-id=239 bgcolor=#d6d6d6
| 348239 Societadante ||  ||  || September 20, 2004 || Andrushivka || Andrushivka Obs. || — || align=right | 3.9 km || 
|-id=240 bgcolor=#fefefe
| 348240 ||  || — || September 17, 2004 || Socorro || LINEAR || — || align=right | 1.0 km || 
|-id=241 bgcolor=#E9E9E9
| 348241 ||  || — || September 17, 2004 || Socorro || LINEAR || — || align=right | 1.3 km || 
|-id=242 bgcolor=#E9E9E9
| 348242 ||  || — || September 18, 2004 || Socorro || LINEAR || — || align=right | 1.3 km || 
|-id=243 bgcolor=#fefefe
| 348243 ||  || — || September 22, 2004 || Socorro || LINEAR || NYS || align=right data-sort-value="0.70" | 700 m || 
|-id=244 bgcolor=#fefefe
| 348244 ||  || — || September 22, 2004 || Kitt Peak || Spacewatch || — || align=right data-sort-value="0.95" | 950 m || 
|-id=245 bgcolor=#fefefe
| 348245 ||  || — || September 16, 2004 || Anderson Mesa || LONEOS || — || align=right data-sort-value="0.91" | 910 m || 
|-id=246 bgcolor=#fefefe
| 348246 ||  || — || October 4, 2004 || Kitt Peak || Spacewatch || MAS || align=right data-sort-value="0.95" | 950 m || 
|-id=247 bgcolor=#E9E9E9
| 348247 ||  || — || October 5, 2004 || Haleakala || NEAT || — || align=right | 3.0 km || 
|-id=248 bgcolor=#fefefe
| 348248 ||  || — || October 8, 2004 || Socorro || LINEAR || H || align=right data-sort-value="0.80" | 800 m || 
|-id=249 bgcolor=#FA8072
| 348249 ||  || — || October 5, 2004 || Goodricke-Pigott || R. A. Tucker || H || align=right | 1.0 km || 
|-id=250 bgcolor=#E9E9E9
| 348250 ||  || — || October 4, 2004 || Kitt Peak || Spacewatch || — || align=right | 1.7 km || 
|-id=251 bgcolor=#fefefe
| 348251 ||  || — || October 6, 2004 || Kitt Peak || Spacewatch || — || align=right data-sort-value="0.98" | 980 m || 
|-id=252 bgcolor=#fefefe
| 348252 ||  || — || October 5, 2004 || Kitt Peak || Spacewatch || NYS || align=right data-sort-value="0.78" | 780 m || 
|-id=253 bgcolor=#fefefe
| 348253 ||  || — || October 5, 2004 || Kitt Peak || Spacewatch || MAScritical || align=right data-sort-value="0.78" | 780 m || 
|-id=254 bgcolor=#fefefe
| 348254 ||  || — || October 6, 2004 || Palomar || NEAT || NYS || align=right data-sort-value="0.95" | 950 m || 
|-id=255 bgcolor=#fefefe
| 348255 ||  || — || October 7, 2004 || Socorro || LINEAR || NYS || align=right data-sort-value="0.82" | 820 m || 
|-id=256 bgcolor=#E9E9E9
| 348256 ||  || — || October 7, 2004 || Palomar || NEAT || — || align=right | 2.2 km || 
|-id=257 bgcolor=#fefefe
| 348257 ||  || — || October 7, 2004 || Goodricke-Pigott || R. A. Tucker || MAS || align=right data-sort-value="0.94" | 940 m || 
|-id=258 bgcolor=#fefefe
| 348258 ||  || — || October 7, 2004 || Socorro || LINEAR || — || align=right | 1.4 km || 
|-id=259 bgcolor=#d6d6d6
| 348259 ||  || — || October 6, 2004 || Kitt Peak || Spacewatch || 3:2 || align=right | 5.9 km || 
|-id=260 bgcolor=#E9E9E9
| 348260 ||  || — || October 8, 2004 || Socorro || LINEAR || — || align=right | 4.1 km || 
|-id=261 bgcolor=#fefefe
| 348261 ||  || — || October 6, 2004 || Kitt Peak || Spacewatch || V || align=right data-sort-value="0.83" | 830 m || 
|-id=262 bgcolor=#fefefe
| 348262 ||  || — || October 7, 2004 || Kitt Peak || Spacewatch || — || align=right data-sort-value="0.97" | 970 m || 
|-id=263 bgcolor=#d6d6d6
| 348263 ||  || — || October 7, 2004 || Kitt Peak || Spacewatch || — || align=right | 2.8 km || 
|-id=264 bgcolor=#fefefe
| 348264 ||  || — || October 5, 2004 || Kitt Peak || Spacewatch || MAS || align=right data-sort-value="0.70" | 700 m || 
|-id=265 bgcolor=#E9E9E9
| 348265 ||  || — || September 14, 2004 || Socorro || LINEAR || — || align=right | 3.0 km || 
|-id=266 bgcolor=#fefefe
| 348266 ||  || — || October 10, 2004 || Kitt Peak || Spacewatch || NYS || align=right data-sort-value="0.71" | 710 m || 
|-id=267 bgcolor=#E9E9E9
| 348267 ||  || — || October 10, 2004 || Socorro || LINEAR || — || align=right | 1.1 km || 
|-id=268 bgcolor=#fefefe
| 348268 ||  || — || October 11, 2004 || Kitt Peak || Spacewatch || — || align=right data-sort-value="0.86" | 860 m || 
|-id=269 bgcolor=#E9E9E9
| 348269 ||  || — || October 4, 2004 || Palomar || NEAT || — || align=right | 1.3 km || 
|-id=270 bgcolor=#fefefe
| 348270 ||  || — || October 13, 2004 || Anderson Mesa || LONEOS || — || align=right | 1.6 km || 
|-id=271 bgcolor=#d6d6d6
| 348271 ||  || — || October 15, 2004 || Socorro || LINEAR || — || align=right | 3.7 km || 
|-id=272 bgcolor=#fefefe
| 348272 ||  || — || October 4, 2004 || Kitt Peak || Spacewatch || MAS || align=right data-sort-value="0.61" | 610 m || 
|-id=273 bgcolor=#fefefe
| 348273 ||  || — || November 3, 2004 || Kitt Peak || Spacewatch || — || align=right | 1.4 km || 
|-id=274 bgcolor=#E9E9E9
| 348274 ||  || — || November 4, 2004 || Kitt Peak || Spacewatch || — || align=right | 1.9 km || 
|-id=275 bgcolor=#fefefe
| 348275 ||  || — || November 4, 2004 || Catalina || CSS || — || align=right | 1.2 km || 
|-id=276 bgcolor=#fefefe
| 348276 ||  || — || November 4, 2004 || Catalina || CSS || — || align=right data-sort-value="0.86" | 860 m || 
|-id=277 bgcolor=#E9E9E9
| 348277 ||  || — || November 4, 2004 || Kitt Peak || Spacewatch || — || align=right | 1.1 km || 
|-id=278 bgcolor=#E9E9E9
| 348278 ||  || — || November 4, 2004 || Catalina || CSS || — || align=right | 1.2 km || 
|-id=279 bgcolor=#fefefe
| 348279 ||  || — || November 9, 2004 || Mauna Kea || C. Veillet || NYS || align=right data-sort-value="0.77" | 770 m || 
|-id=280 bgcolor=#d6d6d6
| 348280 ||  || — || November 19, 2004 || Socorro || LINEAR || — || align=right | 3.7 km || 
|-id=281 bgcolor=#fefefe
| 348281 ||  || — || November 22, 2004 || Socorro || LINEAR || H || align=right | 1.0 km || 
|-id=282 bgcolor=#fefefe
| 348282 ||  || — || December 2, 2004 || Catalina || CSS || — || align=right data-sort-value="0.78" | 780 m || 
|-id=283 bgcolor=#E9E9E9
| 348283 ||  || — || December 3, 2004 || Kitt Peak || Spacewatch || — || align=right | 1.2 km || 
|-id=284 bgcolor=#E9E9E9
| 348284 ||  || — || December 10, 2004 || Kitt Peak || Spacewatch || — || align=right | 1.6 km || 
|-id=285 bgcolor=#E9E9E9
| 348285 ||  || — || December 10, 2004 || Kitt Peak || Spacewatch || RAF || align=right | 1.2 km || 
|-id=286 bgcolor=#E9E9E9
| 348286 ||  || — || December 9, 2004 || Kitt Peak || Spacewatch || — || align=right | 1.8 km || 
|-id=287 bgcolor=#fefefe
| 348287 ||  || — || December 11, 2004 || Campo Imperatore || CINEOS || MAS || align=right data-sort-value="0.88" | 880 m || 
|-id=288 bgcolor=#E9E9E9
| 348288 ||  || — || December 11, 2004 || Campo Imperatore || CINEOS || — || align=right | 1.5 km || 
|-id=289 bgcolor=#d6d6d6
| 348289 ||  || — || December 11, 2004 || Kitt Peak || Spacewatch || 3:2 || align=right | 5.6 km || 
|-id=290 bgcolor=#fefefe
| 348290 ||  || — || December 13, 2004 || Kitt Peak || Spacewatch || — || align=right | 1.3 km || 
|-id=291 bgcolor=#E9E9E9
| 348291 ||  || — || December 12, 2004 || Kitt Peak || Spacewatch || — || align=right | 1.3 km || 
|-id=292 bgcolor=#fefefe
| 348292 ||  || — || December 11, 2004 || Socorro || LINEAR || V || align=right | 1.2 km || 
|-id=293 bgcolor=#E9E9E9
| 348293 ||  || — || December 12, 2004 || Socorro || LINEAR || — || align=right | 1.5 km || 
|-id=294 bgcolor=#fefefe
| 348294 ||  || — || December 8, 2004 || Socorro || LINEAR || — || align=right | 1.8 km || 
|-id=295 bgcolor=#fefefe
| 348295 ||  || — || December 14, 2004 || Campo Imperatore || CINEOS || MAS || align=right | 1.0 km || 
|-id=296 bgcolor=#E9E9E9
| 348296 ||  || — || December 15, 2004 || Socorro || LINEAR || — || align=right | 1.6 km || 
|-id=297 bgcolor=#fefefe
| 348297 ||  || — || December 8, 2004 || Socorro || LINEAR || H || align=right data-sort-value="0.98" | 980 m || 
|-id=298 bgcolor=#d6d6d6
| 348298 ||  || — || December 11, 2004 || Catalina || CSS || EUP || align=right | 5.9 km || 
|-id=299 bgcolor=#E9E9E9
| 348299 ||  || — || December 18, 2004 || Mount Lemmon || Mount Lemmon Survey || — || align=right | 1.5 km || 
|-id=300 bgcolor=#E9E9E9
| 348300 ||  || — || December 18, 2004 || Mount Lemmon || Mount Lemmon Survey || — || align=right | 3.0 km || 
|}

348301–348400 

|-bgcolor=#E9E9E9
| 348301 ||  || — || December 18, 2004 || Mount Lemmon || Mount Lemmon Survey || — || align=right data-sort-value="0.96" | 960 m || 
|-id=302 bgcolor=#E9E9E9
| 348302 ||  || — || December 19, 2004 || Mount Lemmon || Mount Lemmon Survey || — || align=right | 1.1 km || 
|-id=303 bgcolor=#E9E9E9
| 348303 ||  || — || January 1, 2005 || Catalina || CSS || DOR || align=right | 3.9 km || 
|-id=304 bgcolor=#FFC2E0
| 348304 ||  || — || January 8, 2005 || Socorro || LINEAR || AMO +1km || align=right data-sort-value="0.92" | 920 m || 
|-id=305 bgcolor=#E9E9E9
| 348305 ||  || — || January 15, 2005 || Socorro || LINEAR || — || align=right | 3.4 km || 
|-id=306 bgcolor=#FFC2E0
| 348306 ||  || — || January 15, 2005 || Socorro || LINEAR || ATEPHA || align=right data-sort-value="0.18" | 180 m || 
|-id=307 bgcolor=#E9E9E9
| 348307 ||  || — || January 11, 2005 || Socorro || LINEAR || — || align=right | 1.2 km || 
|-id=308 bgcolor=#E9E9E9
| 348308 ||  || — || January 13, 2005 || Kitt Peak || Spacewatch || — || align=right | 1.1 km || 
|-id=309 bgcolor=#E9E9E9
| 348309 ||  || — || January 15, 2005 || Socorro || LINEAR || — || align=right | 1.6 km || 
|-id=310 bgcolor=#E9E9E9
| 348310 ||  || — || January 15, 2005 || Catalina || CSS || — || align=right | 1.6 km || 
|-id=311 bgcolor=#E9E9E9
| 348311 ||  || — || January 15, 2005 || Socorro || LINEAR || — || align=right | 2.8 km || 
|-id=312 bgcolor=#C2FFFF
| 348312 ||  || — || January 15, 2005 || Kitt Peak || Spacewatch || L5ENM || align=right | 15 km || 
|-id=313 bgcolor=#E9E9E9
| 348313 ||  || — || January 15, 2005 || Kitt Peak || Spacewatch || KAZ || align=right | 1.4 km || 
|-id=314 bgcolor=#FFC2E0
| 348314 ||  || — || January 16, 2005 || Catalina || CSS || APO +1kmPHA || align=right data-sort-value="0.93" | 930 m || 
|-id=315 bgcolor=#E9E9E9
| 348315 ||  || — || January 16, 2005 || Socorro || LINEAR || — || align=right | 1.4 km || 
|-id=316 bgcolor=#E9E9E9
| 348316 ||  || — || January 17, 2005 || Kitt Peak || Spacewatch || — || align=right | 1.1 km || 
|-id=317 bgcolor=#d6d6d6
| 348317 ||  || — || January 16, 2005 || Socorro || LINEAR || — || align=right | 4.1 km || 
|-id=318 bgcolor=#E9E9E9
| 348318 ||  || — || January 16, 2005 || Socorro || LINEAR || — || align=right | 1.3 km || 
|-id=319 bgcolor=#E9E9E9
| 348319 ||  || — || February 1, 2005 || Catalina || CSS || EUN || align=right | 1.5 km || 
|-id=320 bgcolor=#fefefe
| 348320 ||  || — || February 1, 2005 || Kitt Peak || Spacewatch || V || align=right data-sort-value="0.78" | 780 m || 
|-id=321 bgcolor=#E9E9E9
| 348321 ||  || — || February 1, 2005 || Kitt Peak || Spacewatch || — || align=right | 1.9 km || 
|-id=322 bgcolor=#E9E9E9
| 348322 ||  || — || February 2, 2005 || Kitt Peak || Spacewatch || — || align=right | 1.5 km || 
|-id=323 bgcolor=#E9E9E9
| 348323 ||  || — || February 1, 2005 || Kitt Peak || Spacewatch || — || align=right | 1.6 km || 
|-id=324 bgcolor=#E9E9E9
| 348324 ||  || — || February 4, 2005 || Kitt Peak || Spacewatch || — || align=right | 1.4 km || 
|-id=325 bgcolor=#E9E9E9
| 348325 ||  || — || February 2, 2005 || Socorro || LINEAR || KON || align=right | 3.7 km || 
|-id=326 bgcolor=#E9E9E9
| 348326 ||  || — || February 2, 2005 || Socorro || LINEAR || — || align=right | 1.2 km || 
|-id=327 bgcolor=#E9E9E9
| 348327 ||  || — || February 3, 2005 || Socorro || LINEAR || JUN || align=right | 1.4 km || 
|-id=328 bgcolor=#E9E9E9
| 348328 ||  || — || February 4, 2005 || Mount Lemmon || Mount Lemmon Survey || — || align=right | 1.4 km || 
|-id=329 bgcolor=#E9E9E9
| 348329 ||  || — || February 9, 2005 || Socorro || LINEAR || — || align=right data-sort-value="0.93" | 930 m || 
|-id=330 bgcolor=#E9E9E9
| 348330 ||  || — || February 1, 2005 || Kitt Peak || Spacewatch || WIT || align=right | 1.3 km || 
|-id=331 bgcolor=#E9E9E9
| 348331 ||  || — || March 1, 2005 || Kitt Peak || Spacewatch || — || align=right data-sort-value="0.91" | 910 m || 
|-id=332 bgcolor=#E9E9E9
| 348332 ||  || — || March 3, 2005 || Socorro || LINEAR || — || align=right | 2.0 km || 
|-id=333 bgcolor=#E9E9E9
| 348333 ||  || — || March 3, 2005 || Catalina || CSS || — || align=right | 2.6 km || 
|-id=334 bgcolor=#fefefe
| 348334 ||  || — || March 4, 2005 || Socorro || LINEAR || H || align=right | 1.1 km || 
|-id=335 bgcolor=#E9E9E9
| 348335 ||  || — || March 4, 2005 || Catalina || CSS || — || align=right | 2.3 km || 
|-id=336 bgcolor=#E9E9E9
| 348336 ||  || — || March 4, 2005 || Catalina || CSS || — || align=right | 2.3 km || 
|-id=337 bgcolor=#E9E9E9
| 348337 ||  || — || March 1, 2005 || Kitt Peak || Spacewatch || JUN || align=right | 1.3 km || 
|-id=338 bgcolor=#E9E9E9
| 348338 ||  || — || March 3, 2005 || Catalina || CSS || — || align=right | 2.0 km || 
|-id=339 bgcolor=#E9E9E9
| 348339 ||  || — || March 3, 2005 || Catalina || CSS || MAR || align=right | 1.3 km || 
|-id=340 bgcolor=#E9E9E9
| 348340 ||  || — || March 3, 2005 || Catalina || CSS || — || align=right | 1.2 km || 
|-id=341 bgcolor=#E9E9E9
| 348341 ||  || — || March 3, 2005 || Catalina || CSS || — || align=right | 2.0 km || 
|-id=342 bgcolor=#E9E9E9
| 348342 ||  || — || March 4, 2005 || Mount Lemmon || Mount Lemmon Survey || — || align=right | 1.8 km || 
|-id=343 bgcolor=#E9E9E9
| 348343 ||  || — || March 7, 2005 || Socorro || LINEAR || EUN || align=right | 1.6 km || 
|-id=344 bgcolor=#E9E9E9
| 348344 ||  || — || March 3, 2005 || Catalina || CSS || JUN || align=right | 1.2 km || 
|-id=345 bgcolor=#E9E9E9
| 348345 ||  || — || March 4, 2005 || Socorro || LINEAR || — || align=right | 1.7 km || 
|-id=346 bgcolor=#E9E9E9
| 348346 ||  || — || March 6, 2005 || Ottmarsheim || Ottmarsheim Obs. || EUN || align=right | 1.8 km || 
|-id=347 bgcolor=#E9E9E9
| 348347 ||  || — || March 3, 2005 || Catalina || CSS || — || align=right data-sort-value="0.76" | 760 m || 
|-id=348 bgcolor=#E9E9E9
| 348348 ||  || — || March 3, 2005 || Catalina || CSS || — || align=right | 1.7 km || 
|-id=349 bgcolor=#fefefe
| 348349 ||  || — || March 4, 2005 || Kitt Peak || Spacewatch || H || align=right data-sort-value="0.99" | 990 m || 
|-id=350 bgcolor=#E9E9E9
| 348350 ||  || — || March 4, 2005 || Socorro || LINEAR || JUN || align=right | 1.1 km || 
|-id=351 bgcolor=#E9E9E9
| 348351 ||  || — || March 4, 2005 || Catalina || CSS || — || align=right | 2.1 km || 
|-id=352 bgcolor=#E9E9E9
| 348352 ||  || — || March 9, 2005 || Socorro || LINEAR || — || align=right data-sort-value="0.94" | 940 m || 
|-id=353 bgcolor=#E9E9E9
| 348353 ||  || — || March 8, 2005 || Catalina || CSS || — || align=right | 2.3 km || 
|-id=354 bgcolor=#E9E9E9
| 348354 ||  || — || March 8, 2005 || Mount Lemmon || Mount Lemmon Survey || — || align=right | 2.3 km || 
|-id=355 bgcolor=#E9E9E9
| 348355 ||  || — || March 9, 2005 || Mount Lemmon || Mount Lemmon Survey || WIT || align=right data-sort-value="0.85" | 850 m || 
|-id=356 bgcolor=#E9E9E9
| 348356 ||  || — || March 11, 2005 || Kitt Peak || Spacewatch || — || align=right | 2.8 km || 
|-id=357 bgcolor=#E9E9E9
| 348357 ||  || — || March 7, 2005 || Socorro || LINEAR || — || align=right | 2.8 km || 
|-id=358 bgcolor=#E9E9E9
| 348358 ||  || — || March 9, 2005 || Kitt Peak || Spacewatch || WIT || align=right | 1.0 km || 
|-id=359 bgcolor=#E9E9E9
| 348359 ||  || — || March 11, 2005 || Mount Lemmon || Mount Lemmon Survey || EUN || align=right | 1.3 km || 
|-id=360 bgcolor=#E9E9E9
| 348360 ||  || — || March 10, 2005 || Mount Lemmon || Mount Lemmon Survey || MIS || align=right | 2.6 km || 
|-id=361 bgcolor=#E9E9E9
| 348361 ||  || — || March 10, 2005 || Anderson Mesa || LONEOS || — || align=right | 2.1 km || 
|-id=362 bgcolor=#E9E9E9
| 348362 ||  || — || March 11, 2005 || Anderson Mesa || LONEOS || IAN || align=right | 1.0 km || 
|-id=363 bgcolor=#E9E9E9
| 348363 ||  || — || March 11, 2005 || Anderson Mesa || LONEOS || — || align=right | 1.5 km || 
|-id=364 bgcolor=#E9E9E9
| 348364 ||  || — || March 12, 2005 || Kitt Peak || Spacewatch || — || align=right | 1.3 km || 
|-id=365 bgcolor=#E9E9E9
| 348365 ||  || — || March 11, 2005 || Mount Lemmon || Mount Lemmon Survey || — || align=right | 2.6 km || 
|-id=366 bgcolor=#E9E9E9
| 348366 ||  || — || March 11, 2005 || Mount Lemmon || Mount Lemmon Survey || GEF || align=right | 1.6 km || 
|-id=367 bgcolor=#E9E9E9
| 348367 ||  || — || March 11, 2005 || Kitt Peak || Spacewatch || — || align=right | 1.9 km || 
|-id=368 bgcolor=#fefefe
| 348368 ||  || — || March 13, 2005 || Kitt Peak || Spacewatch || — || align=right data-sort-value="0.76" | 760 m || 
|-id=369 bgcolor=#E9E9E9
| 348369 ||  || — || March 8, 2005 || Mount Lemmon || Mount Lemmon Survey || — || align=right data-sort-value="0.94" | 940 m || 
|-id=370 bgcolor=#E9E9E9
| 348370 ||  || — || March 10, 2005 || Catalina || CSS || — || align=right | 2.9 km || 
|-id=371 bgcolor=#E9E9E9
| 348371 ||  || — || March 10, 2005 || Catalina || CSS || ADE || align=right | 2.3 km || 
|-id=372 bgcolor=#E9E9E9
| 348372 ||  || — || March 1, 2005 || Catalina || CSS || GER || align=right | 2.7 km || 
|-id=373 bgcolor=#E9E9E9
| 348373 ||  || — || March 8, 2005 || Socorro || LINEAR || EUN || align=right | 1.4 km || 
|-id=374 bgcolor=#E9E9E9
| 348374 ||  || — || March 8, 2005 || Socorro || LINEAR || — || align=right | 1.6 km || 
|-id=375 bgcolor=#E9E9E9
| 348375 ||  || — || March 12, 2005 || Kitt Peak || Spacewatch || — || align=right | 2.9 km || 
|-id=376 bgcolor=#E9E9E9
| 348376 ||  || — || April 1, 2005 || Catalina || CSS || — || align=right | 2.7 km || 
|-id=377 bgcolor=#E9E9E9
| 348377 ||  || — || April 1, 2005 || Catalina || CSS || — || align=right | 2.2 km || 
|-id=378 bgcolor=#d6d6d6
| 348378 ||  || — || April 1, 2005 || Kitt Peak || Spacewatch || CHA || align=right | 2.5 km || 
|-id=379 bgcolor=#E9E9E9
| 348379 ||  || — || April 1, 2005 || Anderson Mesa || LONEOS || — || align=right | 1.8 km || 
|-id=380 bgcolor=#E9E9E9
| 348380 ||  || — || April 1, 2005 || Anderson Mesa || LONEOS || — || align=right | 3.2 km || 
|-id=381 bgcolor=#E9E9E9
| 348381 ||  || — || April 2, 2005 || Mount Lemmon || Mount Lemmon Survey || — || align=right | 2.0 km || 
|-id=382 bgcolor=#E9E9E9
| 348382 ||  || — || April 2, 2005 || Mount Lemmon || Mount Lemmon Survey || WIT || align=right data-sort-value="0.96" | 960 m || 
|-id=383 bgcolor=#fefefe
| 348383 Petibon ||  ||  || April 2, 2005 || Nogales || J.-C. Merlin || MAS || align=right data-sort-value="0.74" | 740 m || 
|-id=384 bgcolor=#E9E9E9
| 348384 ||  || — || April 3, 2005 || Palomar || NEAT || — || align=right | 2.6 km || 
|-id=385 bgcolor=#E9E9E9
| 348385 ||  || — || April 5, 2005 || Mount Lemmon || Mount Lemmon Survey || — || align=right | 2.5 km || 
|-id=386 bgcolor=#d6d6d6
| 348386 ||  || — || April 2, 2005 || Catalina || CSS || BRA || align=right | 1.9 km || 
|-id=387 bgcolor=#E9E9E9
| 348387 ||  || — || April 6, 2005 || Catalina || CSS || MIT || align=right | 3.2 km || 
|-id=388 bgcolor=#E9E9E9
| 348388 ||  || — || April 7, 2005 || Kitt Peak || Spacewatch || — || align=right | 1.8 km || 
|-id=389 bgcolor=#E9E9E9
| 348389 ||  || — || April 7, 2005 || Siding Spring || SSS || ADE || align=right | 3.1 km || 
|-id=390 bgcolor=#fefefe
| 348390 ||  || — || March 10, 2005 || Mount Lemmon || Mount Lemmon Survey || — || align=right data-sort-value="0.72" | 720 m || 
|-id=391 bgcolor=#E9E9E9
| 348391 ||  || — || April 11, 2005 || Kitt Peak || Spacewatch || AGN || align=right | 1.2 km || 
|-id=392 bgcolor=#fefefe
| 348392 ||  || — || April 10, 2005 || Catalina || CSS || PHO || align=right | 2.8 km || 
|-id=393 bgcolor=#E9E9E9
| 348393 ||  || — || April 9, 2005 || Socorro || LINEAR || — || align=right | 3.3 km || 
|-id=394 bgcolor=#E9E9E9
| 348394 ||  || — || April 9, 2005 || Catalina || CSS || — || align=right | 2.4 km || 
|-id=395 bgcolor=#E9E9E9
| 348395 ||  || — || April 12, 2005 || Kitt Peak || Spacewatch || — || align=right | 1.4 km || 
|-id=396 bgcolor=#E9E9E9
| 348396 ||  || — || April 17, 2005 || Junk Bond || Junk Bond Obs. || WIT || align=right | 1.3 km || 
|-id=397 bgcolor=#fefefe
| 348397 ||  || — || April 30, 2005 || Kitt Peak || Spacewatch || V || align=right data-sort-value="0.69" | 690 m || 
|-id=398 bgcolor=#E9E9E9
| 348398 ||  || — || April 30, 2005 || Kitt Peak || Spacewatch || — || align=right | 3.3 km || 
|-id=399 bgcolor=#E9E9E9
| 348399 ||  || — || May 3, 2005 || Kitt Peak || Spacewatch || — || align=right | 2.9 km || 
|-id=400 bgcolor=#FFC2E0
| 348400 ||  || — || May 4, 2005 || Kitt Peak || Spacewatch || AMO +1kmPHAmoon || align=right | 1.2 km || 
|}

348401–348500 

|-bgcolor=#E9E9E9
| 348401 ||  || — || May 3, 2005 || Kitt Peak || Spacewatch || INO || align=right | 1.4 km || 
|-id=402 bgcolor=#C2FFFF
| 348402 ||  || — || May 4, 2005 || Kitt Peak || Spacewatch || L4 || align=right | 12 km || 
|-id=403 bgcolor=#d6d6d6
| 348403 ||  || — || May 8, 2005 || Kitt Peak || Spacewatch || — || align=right | 2.2 km || 
|-id=404 bgcolor=#E9E9E9
| 348404 ||  || — || May 4, 2005 || Mount Lemmon || Mount Lemmon Survey || BAR || align=right | 1.4 km || 
|-id=405 bgcolor=#E9E9E9
| 348405 ||  || — || May 8, 2005 || Kitt Peak || Spacewatch || — || align=right | 3.1 km || 
|-id=406 bgcolor=#E9E9E9
| 348406 ||  || — || May 11, 2005 || Palomar || NEAT || EUN || align=right | 2.0 km || 
|-id=407 bgcolor=#fefefe
| 348407 Patkósandrás ||  ||  || May 12, 2005 || Piszkéstető || K. Sárneczky || H || align=right data-sort-value="0.66" | 660 m || 
|-id=408 bgcolor=#E9E9E9
| 348408 ||  || — || May 8, 2005 || Kitt Peak || Spacewatch || AGN || align=right | 1.4 km || 
|-id=409 bgcolor=#d6d6d6
| 348409 ||  || — || May 10, 2005 || Kitt Peak || Spacewatch || — || align=right | 3.5 km || 
|-id=410 bgcolor=#d6d6d6
| 348410 ||  || — || May 13, 2005 || Kitt Peak || Spacewatch || — || align=right | 2.5 km || 
|-id=411 bgcolor=#E9E9E9
| 348411 ||  || — || May 11, 2005 || Cerro Tololo || M. W. Buie || — || align=right | 1.8 km || 
|-id=412 bgcolor=#E9E9E9
| 348412 ||  || — || May 30, 2005 || Mayhill || A. Lowe || — || align=right | 1.0 km || 
|-id=413 bgcolor=#fefefe
| 348413 ||  || — || June 30, 2005 || Kitt Peak || Spacewatch || — || align=right data-sort-value="0.69" | 690 m || 
|-id=414 bgcolor=#E9E9E9
| 348414 ||  || — || June 30, 2005 || Palomar || NEAT || — || align=right | 2.5 km || 
|-id=415 bgcolor=#d6d6d6
| 348415 ||  || — || June 27, 2005 || Kitt Peak || Spacewatch || — || align=right | 2.6 km || 
|-id=416 bgcolor=#d6d6d6
| 348416 ||  || — || June 20, 2005 || Palomar || NEAT || TIR || align=right | 3.5 km || 
|-id=417 bgcolor=#d6d6d6
| 348417 ||  || — || July 1, 2005 || Kitt Peak || Spacewatch || URS || align=right | 3.7 km || 
|-id=418 bgcolor=#d6d6d6
| 348418 ||  || — || July 5, 2005 || Mount Lemmon || Mount Lemmon Survey || HYG || align=right | 3.0 km || 
|-id=419 bgcolor=#d6d6d6
| 348419 ||  || — || July 10, 2005 || Kitt Peak || Spacewatch || EOS || align=right | 2.0 km || 
|-id=420 bgcolor=#d6d6d6
| 348420 ||  || — || July 5, 2005 || Mount Lemmon || Mount Lemmon Survey || EOS || align=right | 2.3 km || 
|-id=421 bgcolor=#fefefe
| 348421 ||  || — || July 1, 2005 || Kitt Peak || Spacewatch || — || align=right data-sort-value="0.67" | 670 m || 
|-id=422 bgcolor=#E9E9E9
| 348422 ||  || — || June 17, 2005 || Mount Lemmon || Mount Lemmon Survey || GEF || align=right | 1.3 km || 
|-id=423 bgcolor=#d6d6d6
| 348423 ||  || — || July 11, 2005 || Kitt Peak || Spacewatch || — || align=right | 3.6 km || 
|-id=424 bgcolor=#fefefe
| 348424 ||  || — || July 4, 2005 || Kitt Peak || Spacewatch || — || align=right data-sort-value="0.67" | 670 m || 
|-id=425 bgcolor=#d6d6d6
| 348425 ||  || — || July 4, 2005 || Palomar || NEAT || — || align=right | 5.2 km || 
|-id=426 bgcolor=#fefefe
| 348426 ||  || — || July 28, 2005 || Palomar || NEAT || V || align=right data-sort-value="0.80" | 800 m || 
|-id=427 bgcolor=#fefefe
| 348427 ||  || — || July 27, 2005 || Palomar || NEAT || — || align=right data-sort-value="0.91" | 910 m || 
|-id=428 bgcolor=#fefefe
| 348428 ||  || — || July 30, 2005 || Palomar || NEAT || — || align=right | 1.1 km || 
|-id=429 bgcolor=#d6d6d6
| 348429 ||  || — || July 28, 2005 || Palomar || NEAT || — || align=right | 5.6 km || 
|-id=430 bgcolor=#fefefe
| 348430 ||  || — || August 24, 2005 || Palomar || NEAT || — || align=right | 1.7 km || 
|-id=431 bgcolor=#fefefe
| 348431 ||  || — || August 24, 2005 || Palomar || NEAT || FLO || align=right data-sort-value="0.87" | 870 m || 
|-id=432 bgcolor=#FA8072
| 348432 ||  || — || August 24, 2005 || Palomar || NEAT || — || align=right data-sort-value="0.72" | 720 m || 
|-id=433 bgcolor=#fefefe
| 348433 ||  || — || August 25, 2005 || Palomar || NEAT || — || align=right data-sort-value="0.94" | 940 m || 
|-id=434 bgcolor=#d6d6d6
| 348434 ||  || — || August 25, 2005 || Campo Imperatore || CINEOS || EOS || align=right | 2.8 km || 
|-id=435 bgcolor=#fefefe
| 348435 ||  || — || August 25, 2005 || Palomar || NEAT || — || align=right data-sort-value="0.69" | 690 m || 
|-id=436 bgcolor=#d6d6d6
| 348436 ||  || — || August 28, 2005 || Kitt Peak || Spacewatch || — || align=right | 6.1 km || 
|-id=437 bgcolor=#fefefe
| 348437 ||  || — || August 26, 2005 || Anderson Mesa || LONEOS || — || align=right data-sort-value="0.66" | 660 m || 
|-id=438 bgcolor=#d6d6d6
| 348438 ||  || — || August 26, 2005 || Palomar || NEAT || — || align=right | 2.5 km || 
|-id=439 bgcolor=#fefefe
| 348439 ||  || — || August 29, 2005 || Anderson Mesa || LONEOS || MAS || align=right data-sort-value="0.90" | 900 m || 
|-id=440 bgcolor=#fefefe
| 348440 ||  || — || August 29, 2005 || Anderson Mesa || LONEOS || FLO || align=right data-sort-value="0.88" | 880 m || 
|-id=441 bgcolor=#fefefe
| 348441 ||  || — || July 30, 2005 || Palomar || NEAT || FLO || align=right data-sort-value="0.60" | 600 m || 
|-id=442 bgcolor=#FA8072
| 348442 ||  || — || August 30, 2005 || Socorro || LINEAR || — || align=right data-sort-value="0.73" | 730 m || 
|-id=443 bgcolor=#fefefe
| 348443 ||  || — || August 27, 2005 || Palomar || NEAT || — || align=right data-sort-value="0.66" | 660 m || 
|-id=444 bgcolor=#E9E9E9
| 348444 ||  || — || August 27, 2005 || Palomar || NEAT || — || align=right | 2.7 km || 
|-id=445 bgcolor=#E9E9E9
| 348445 ||  || — || August 28, 2005 || Kitt Peak || Spacewatch || — || align=right | 2.0 km || 
|-id=446 bgcolor=#fefefe
| 348446 ||  || — || August 30, 2005 || Kitt Peak || Spacewatch || — || align=right data-sort-value="0.66" | 660 m || 
|-id=447 bgcolor=#fefefe
| 348447 ||  || — || August 27, 2005 || Palomar || NEAT || V || align=right data-sort-value="0.69" | 690 m || 
|-id=448 bgcolor=#fefefe
| 348448 ||  || — || August 28, 2005 || Anderson Mesa || LONEOS || PHO || align=right | 1.4 km || 
|-id=449 bgcolor=#fefefe
| 348449 ||  || — || August 31, 2005 || Anderson Mesa || LONEOS || — || align=right | 1.1 km || 
|-id=450 bgcolor=#fefefe
| 348450 ||  || — || August 29, 2005 || Palomar || NEAT || FLO || align=right data-sort-value="0.65" | 650 m || 
|-id=451 bgcolor=#E9E9E9
| 348451 ||  || — || September 9, 2005 || Socorro || LINEAR || — || align=right | 3.4 km || 
|-id=452 bgcolor=#fefefe
| 348452 ||  || — || September 1, 2005 || Palomar || NEAT || H || align=right data-sort-value="0.78" | 780 m || 
|-id=453 bgcolor=#d6d6d6
| 348453 ||  || — || September 11, 2005 || Anderson Mesa || LONEOS || — || align=right | 4.6 km || 
|-id=454 bgcolor=#E9E9E9
| 348454 ||  || — || September 10, 2005 || Anderson Mesa || LONEOS || — || align=right | 3.1 km || 
|-id=455 bgcolor=#d6d6d6
| 348455 ||  || — || September 15, 2005 || Socorro || LINEAR || EUP || align=right | 6.6 km || 
|-id=456 bgcolor=#d6d6d6
| 348456 ||  || — || September 14, 2005 || Apache Point || A. C. Becker || — || align=right | 4.7 km || 
|-id=457 bgcolor=#E9E9E9
| 348457 ||  || — || August 30, 2005 || Palomar || NEAT || — || align=right | 2.3 km || 
|-id=458 bgcolor=#d6d6d6
| 348458 ||  || — || September 24, 2005 || Kitt Peak || Spacewatch || HYG || align=right | 3.4 km || 
|-id=459 bgcolor=#fefefe
| 348459 ||  || — || June 18, 2005 || Mount Lemmon || Mount Lemmon Survey || FLO || align=right data-sort-value="0.80" | 800 m || 
|-id=460 bgcolor=#fefefe
| 348460 ||  || — || September 26, 2005 || Kitt Peak || Spacewatch || FLO || align=right data-sort-value="0.58" | 580 m || 
|-id=461 bgcolor=#FFC2E0
| 348461 ||  || — || September 26, 2005 || Kitt Peak || Spacewatch || APO +1km || align=right | 1.4 km || 
|-id=462 bgcolor=#fefefe
| 348462 ||  || — || September 23, 2005 || Kitt Peak || Spacewatch || FLO || align=right data-sort-value="0.82" | 820 m || 
|-id=463 bgcolor=#fefefe
| 348463 ||  || — || September 24, 2005 || Anderson Mesa || LONEOS || — || align=right | 1.0 km || 
|-id=464 bgcolor=#fefefe
| 348464 ||  || — || September 23, 2005 || Kitt Peak || Spacewatch || — || align=right data-sort-value="0.74" | 740 m || 
|-id=465 bgcolor=#fefefe
| 348465 ||  || — || September 26, 2005 || Kitt Peak || Spacewatch || — || align=right data-sort-value="0.71" | 710 m || 
|-id=466 bgcolor=#fefefe
| 348466 ||  || — || September 26, 2005 || Kitt Peak || Spacewatch || FLO || align=right data-sort-value="0.95" | 950 m || 
|-id=467 bgcolor=#d6d6d6
| 348467 ||  || — || September 27, 2005 || Kitt Peak || Spacewatch || — || align=right | 3.0 km || 
|-id=468 bgcolor=#fefefe
| 348468 ||  || — || September 23, 2005 || Kitt Peak || Spacewatch || V || align=right data-sort-value="0.76" | 760 m || 
|-id=469 bgcolor=#d6d6d6
| 348469 ||  || — || September 28, 2005 || Palomar || NEAT || — || align=right | 3.2 km || 
|-id=470 bgcolor=#d6d6d6
| 348470 ||  || — || September 24, 2005 || Kitt Peak || Spacewatch || — || align=right | 4.5 km || 
|-id=471 bgcolor=#fefefe
| 348471 ||  || — || August 30, 2005 || Palomar || NEAT || V || align=right data-sort-value="0.67" | 670 m || 
|-id=472 bgcolor=#fefefe
| 348472 ||  || — || September 24, 2005 || Kitt Peak || Spacewatch || FLO || align=right data-sort-value="0.69" | 690 m || 
|-id=473 bgcolor=#fefefe
| 348473 ||  || — || August 31, 2005 || Kitt Peak || Spacewatch || FLO || align=right data-sort-value="0.68" | 680 m || 
|-id=474 bgcolor=#fefefe
| 348474 ||  || — || September 25, 2005 || Kitt Peak || Spacewatch || — || align=right data-sort-value="0.85" | 850 m || 
|-id=475 bgcolor=#d6d6d6
| 348475 ||  || — || September 26, 2005 || Palomar || NEAT || — || align=right | 4.1 km || 
|-id=476 bgcolor=#fefefe
| 348476 ||  || — || September 29, 2005 || Kitt Peak || Spacewatch || — || align=right data-sort-value="0.79" | 790 m || 
|-id=477 bgcolor=#fefefe
| 348477 ||  || — || August 31, 2005 || Anderson Mesa || LONEOS || — || align=right | 1.2 km || 
|-id=478 bgcolor=#fefefe
| 348478 ||  || — || September 29, 2005 || Anderson Mesa || LONEOS || FLO || align=right data-sort-value="0.67" | 670 m || 
|-id=479 bgcolor=#fefefe
| 348479 ||  || — || September 25, 2005 || Kitt Peak || Spacewatch || — || align=right data-sort-value="0.91" | 910 m || 
|-id=480 bgcolor=#fefefe
| 348480 ||  || — || September 26, 2005 || Palomar || NEAT || FLO || align=right data-sort-value="0.64" | 640 m || 
|-id=481 bgcolor=#fefefe
| 348481 ||  || — || September 27, 2005 || Palomar || NEAT || FLO || align=right data-sort-value="0.90" | 900 m || 
|-id=482 bgcolor=#fefefe
| 348482 ||  || — || September 29, 2005 || Kitt Peak || Spacewatch || — || align=right data-sort-value="0.92" | 920 m || 
|-id=483 bgcolor=#fefefe
| 348483 ||  || — || September 29, 2005 || Kitt Peak || Spacewatch || V || align=right data-sort-value="0.67" | 670 m || 
|-id=484 bgcolor=#d6d6d6
| 348484 ||  || — || September 29, 2005 || Mount Lemmon || Mount Lemmon Survey || — || align=right | 3.1 km || 
|-id=485 bgcolor=#fefefe
| 348485 ||  || — || September 29, 2005 || Kitt Peak || Spacewatch || — || align=right data-sort-value="0.82" | 820 m || 
|-id=486 bgcolor=#E9E9E9
| 348486 ||  || — || September 30, 2005 || Kitt Peak || Spacewatch || — || align=right | 1.2 km || 
|-id=487 bgcolor=#fefefe
| 348487 ||  || — || September 30, 2005 || Kitt Peak || Spacewatch || — || align=right data-sort-value="0.90" | 900 m || 
|-id=488 bgcolor=#fefefe
| 348488 ||  || — || September 30, 2005 || Mount Lemmon || Mount Lemmon Survey || — || align=right data-sort-value="0.73" | 730 m || 
|-id=489 bgcolor=#d6d6d6
| 348489 ||  || — || September 30, 2005 || Mount Lemmon || Mount Lemmon Survey || — || align=right | 2.1 km || 
|-id=490 bgcolor=#FA8072
| 348490 ||  || — || September 29, 2005 || Catalina || CSS || — || align=right | 2.3 km || 
|-id=491 bgcolor=#fefefe
| 348491 ||  || — || September 30, 2005 || Mount Lemmon || Mount Lemmon Survey || — || align=right data-sort-value="0.70" | 700 m || 
|-id=492 bgcolor=#fefefe
| 348492 ||  || — || September 30, 2005 || Kitt Peak || Spacewatch || — || align=right data-sort-value="0.89" | 890 m || 
|-id=493 bgcolor=#fefefe
| 348493 ||  || — || September 30, 2005 || Kitt Peak || Spacewatch || — || align=right data-sort-value="0.80" | 800 m || 
|-id=494 bgcolor=#fefefe
| 348494 ||  || — || September 23, 2005 || Catalina || CSS || — || align=right data-sort-value="0.73" | 730 m || 
|-id=495 bgcolor=#fefefe
| 348495 ||  || — || September 30, 2005 || Mount Lemmon || Mount Lemmon Survey || — || align=right data-sort-value="0.86" | 860 m || 
|-id=496 bgcolor=#fefefe
| 348496 ||  || — || September 26, 2005 || Apache Point || A. C. Becker || — || align=right data-sort-value="0.94" | 940 m || 
|-id=497 bgcolor=#fefefe
| 348497 ||  || — || October 1, 2005 || Catalina || CSS || FLO || align=right data-sort-value="0.70" | 700 m || 
|-id=498 bgcolor=#fefefe
| 348498 ||  || — || October 1, 2005 || Catalina || CSS || — || align=right data-sort-value="0.85" | 850 m || 
|-id=499 bgcolor=#fefefe
| 348499 ||  || — || October 1, 2005 || Kitt Peak || Spacewatch || — || align=right data-sort-value="0.59" | 590 m || 
|-id=500 bgcolor=#fefefe
| 348500 ||  || — || October 5, 2005 || Catalina || CSS || — || align=right | 1.3 km || 
|}

348501–348600 

|-bgcolor=#fefefe
| 348501 ||  || — || October 5, 2005 || Kitt Peak || Spacewatch || — || align=right data-sort-value="0.74" | 740 m || 
|-id=502 bgcolor=#fefefe
| 348502 ||  || — || October 7, 2005 || Kitt Peak || Spacewatch || — || align=right data-sort-value="0.54" | 540 m || 
|-id=503 bgcolor=#fefefe
| 348503 ||  || — || October 3, 2005 || Kitt Peak || Spacewatch || — || align=right data-sort-value="0.80" | 800 m || 
|-id=504 bgcolor=#fefefe
| 348504 ||  || — || September 30, 2005 || Catalina || CSS || FLO || align=right data-sort-value="0.91" | 910 m || 
|-id=505 bgcolor=#fefefe
| 348505 ||  || — || October 9, 2005 || Kitt Peak || Spacewatch || — || align=right | 1.2 km || 
|-id=506 bgcolor=#d6d6d6
| 348506 ||  || — || October 6, 2005 || Mount Lemmon || Mount Lemmon Survey || — || align=right | 3.6 km || 
|-id=507 bgcolor=#fefefe
| 348507 ||  || — || October 8, 2005 || Kitt Peak || Spacewatch || — || align=right data-sort-value="0.80" | 800 m || 
|-id=508 bgcolor=#E9E9E9
| 348508 ||  || — || September 30, 2005 || Catalina || CSS || — || align=right | 3.4 km || 
|-id=509 bgcolor=#fefefe
| 348509 ||  || — || October 9, 2005 || Kitt Peak || Spacewatch || — || align=right data-sort-value="0.68" | 680 m || 
|-id=510 bgcolor=#E9E9E9
| 348510 ||  || — || September 10, 2005 || Anderson Mesa || LONEOS || — || align=right | 3.8 km || 
|-id=511 bgcolor=#fefefe
| 348511 Žemaitė ||  ||  || October 10, 2005 || Moletai || K. Černis, J. Zdanavičius || — || align=right | 1.7 km || 
|-id=512 bgcolor=#fefefe
| 348512 ||  || — || October 1, 2005 || Anderson Mesa || LONEOS || — || align=right | 1.1 km || 
|-id=513 bgcolor=#d6d6d6
| 348513 ||  || — || October 27, 2005 || Socorro || LINEAR || — || align=right | 3.6 km || 
|-id=514 bgcolor=#fefefe
| 348514 ||  || — || October 22, 2005 || Kitt Peak || Spacewatch || — || align=right data-sort-value="0.94" | 940 m || 
|-id=515 bgcolor=#d6d6d6
| 348515 ||  || — || October 22, 2005 || Kitt Peak || Spacewatch || — || align=right | 3.4 km || 
|-id=516 bgcolor=#d6d6d6
| 348516 ||  || — || October 24, 2005 || Kitt Peak || Spacewatch || — || align=right | 2.9 km || 
|-id=517 bgcolor=#d6d6d6
| 348517 ||  || — || October 24, 2005 || Kitt Peak || Spacewatch || — || align=right | 2.3 km || 
|-id=518 bgcolor=#E9E9E9
| 348518 ||  || — || October 22, 2005 || Kitt Peak || Spacewatch || HEN || align=right | 1.2 km || 
|-id=519 bgcolor=#d6d6d6
| 348519 ||  || — || October 23, 2005 || Catalina || CSS || slow || align=right | 3.5 km || 
|-id=520 bgcolor=#fefefe
| 348520 ||  || — || October 24, 2005 || Anderson Mesa || LONEOS || — || align=right data-sort-value="0.87" | 870 m || 
|-id=521 bgcolor=#d6d6d6
| 348521 ||  || — || October 24, 2005 || Anderson Mesa || LONEOS || — || align=right | 3.6 km || 
|-id=522 bgcolor=#fefefe
| 348522 ||  || — || October 24, 2005 || Kitt Peak || Spacewatch || FLO || align=right data-sort-value="0.73" | 730 m || 
|-id=523 bgcolor=#d6d6d6
| 348523 ||  || — || October 22, 2005 || Kitt Peak || Spacewatch || — || align=right | 3.3 km || 
|-id=524 bgcolor=#fefefe
| 348524 ||  || — || October 23, 2005 || Catalina || CSS || V || align=right data-sort-value="0.55" | 550 m || 
|-id=525 bgcolor=#d6d6d6
| 348525 ||  || — || October 23, 2005 || Catalina || CSS || — || align=right | 6.1 km || 
|-id=526 bgcolor=#d6d6d6
| 348526 ||  || — || October 24, 2005 || Palomar || NEAT || — || align=right | 5.5 km || 
|-id=527 bgcolor=#d6d6d6
| 348527 ||  || — || October 22, 2005 || Kitt Peak || Spacewatch || THM || align=right | 2.5 km || 
|-id=528 bgcolor=#d6d6d6
| 348528 ||  || — || October 22, 2005 || Kitt Peak || Spacewatch || — || align=right | 2.5 km || 
|-id=529 bgcolor=#fefefe
| 348529 ||  || — || October 22, 2005 || Kitt Peak || Spacewatch || FLO || align=right data-sort-value="0.67" | 670 m || 
|-id=530 bgcolor=#fefefe
| 348530 ||  || — || October 22, 2005 || Kitt Peak || Spacewatch || — || align=right data-sort-value="0.99" | 990 m || 
|-id=531 bgcolor=#fefefe
| 348531 ||  || — || October 24, 2005 || Kitt Peak || Spacewatch || NYS || align=right data-sort-value="0.59" | 590 m || 
|-id=532 bgcolor=#fefefe
| 348532 ||  || — || October 24, 2005 || Palomar || NEAT || — || align=right data-sort-value="0.87" | 870 m || 
|-id=533 bgcolor=#fefefe
| 348533 ||  || — || October 25, 2005 || Catalina || CSS || — || align=right | 1.2 km || 
|-id=534 bgcolor=#d6d6d6
| 348534 ||  || — || October 26, 2005 || Kitt Peak || Spacewatch || KAR || align=right | 1.1 km || 
|-id=535 bgcolor=#d6d6d6
| 348535 ||  || — || October 25, 2005 || Mount Lemmon || Mount Lemmon Survey || — || align=right | 3.8 km || 
|-id=536 bgcolor=#fefefe
| 348536 ||  || — || October 24, 2005 || Kitt Peak || Spacewatch || FLO || align=right data-sort-value="0.70" | 700 m || 
|-id=537 bgcolor=#fefefe
| 348537 ||  || — || October 22, 2005 || Kitt Peak || Spacewatch || — || align=right data-sort-value="0.54" | 540 m || 
|-id=538 bgcolor=#d6d6d6
| 348538 ||  || — || October 24, 2005 || Kitt Peak || Spacewatch || — || align=right | 2.2 km || 
|-id=539 bgcolor=#fefefe
| 348539 ||  || — || October 25, 2005 || Kitt Peak || Spacewatch || FLO || align=right data-sort-value="0.83" | 830 m || 
|-id=540 bgcolor=#fefefe
| 348540 ||  || — || October 25, 2005 || Kitt Peak || Spacewatch || FLO || align=right data-sort-value="0.77" | 770 m || 
|-id=541 bgcolor=#E9E9E9
| 348541 ||  || — || October 25, 2005 || Kitt Peak || Spacewatch || EUN || align=right | 1.5 km || 
|-id=542 bgcolor=#fefefe
| 348542 ||  || — || October 23, 2005 || Palomar || NEAT || NYS || align=right data-sort-value="0.64" | 640 m || 
|-id=543 bgcolor=#fefefe
| 348543 ||  || — || October 23, 2005 || Palomar || NEAT || — || align=right | 1.2 km || 
|-id=544 bgcolor=#d6d6d6
| 348544 ||  || — || October 28, 2005 || Catalina || CSS || — || align=right | 3.9 km || 
|-id=545 bgcolor=#fefefe
| 348545 ||  || — || October 26, 2005 || Kitt Peak || Spacewatch || FLO || align=right data-sort-value="0.59" | 590 m || 
|-id=546 bgcolor=#fefefe
| 348546 ||  || — || October 26, 2005 || Kitt Peak || Spacewatch || — || align=right data-sort-value="0.72" | 720 m || 
|-id=547 bgcolor=#fefefe
| 348547 ||  || — || October 27, 2005 || Kitt Peak || Spacewatch || V || align=right data-sort-value="0.74" | 740 m || 
|-id=548 bgcolor=#fefefe
| 348548 ||  || — || October 29, 2005 || Kitt Peak || Spacewatch || — || align=right data-sort-value="0.76" | 760 m || 
|-id=549 bgcolor=#fefefe
| 348549 ||  || — || October 28, 2005 || Mount Lemmon || Mount Lemmon Survey || FLO || align=right data-sort-value="0.57" | 570 m || 
|-id=550 bgcolor=#d6d6d6
| 348550 ||  || — || October 27, 2005 || Kitt Peak || Spacewatch || 7:4 || align=right | 3.8 km || 
|-id=551 bgcolor=#fefefe
| 348551 ||  || — || October 27, 2005 || Kitt Peak || Spacewatch || — || align=right data-sort-value="0.99" | 990 m || 
|-id=552 bgcolor=#d6d6d6
| 348552 ||  || — || October 22, 2005 || Catalina || CSS || — || align=right | 3.0 km || 
|-id=553 bgcolor=#E9E9E9
| 348553 ||  || — || September 30, 2005 || Mount Lemmon || Mount Lemmon Survey || — || align=right | 2.4 km || 
|-id=554 bgcolor=#fefefe
| 348554 ||  || — || October 24, 2005 || Kitt Peak || Spacewatch || FLO || align=right data-sort-value="0.71" | 710 m || 
|-id=555 bgcolor=#fefefe
| 348555 ||  || — || October 28, 2005 || Mount Lemmon || Mount Lemmon Survey || NYS || align=right data-sort-value="0.66" | 660 m || 
|-id=556 bgcolor=#d6d6d6
| 348556 ||  || — || October 23, 2005 || Palomar || NEAT || — || align=right | 3.3 km || 
|-id=557 bgcolor=#fefefe
| 348557 ||  || — || October 28, 2005 || Mount Lemmon || Mount Lemmon Survey || FLO || align=right data-sort-value="0.80" | 800 m || 
|-id=558 bgcolor=#fefefe
| 348558 ||  || — || October 26, 2005 || Socorro || LINEAR || KLI || align=right | 2.1 km || 
|-id=559 bgcolor=#fefefe
| 348559 ||  || — || November 3, 2005 || Catalina || CSS || — || align=right | 1.1 km || 
|-id=560 bgcolor=#fefefe
| 348560 ||  || — || November 4, 2005 || Socorro || LINEAR || NYS || align=right data-sort-value="0.77" | 770 m || 
|-id=561 bgcolor=#d6d6d6
| 348561 ||  || — || November 4, 2005 || Kitt Peak || Spacewatch || — || align=right | 2.6 km || 
|-id=562 bgcolor=#fefefe
| 348562 ||  || — || November 2, 2005 || Mount Lemmon || Mount Lemmon Survey || CHL || align=right | 2.2 km || 
|-id=563 bgcolor=#fefefe
| 348563 ||  || — || November 4, 2005 || Mount Lemmon || Mount Lemmon Survey || — || align=right data-sort-value="0.89" | 890 m || 
|-id=564 bgcolor=#fefefe
| 348564 ||  || — || October 31, 2005 || Mount Lemmon || Mount Lemmon Survey || — || align=right data-sort-value="0.82" | 820 m || 
|-id=565 bgcolor=#fefefe
| 348565 ||  || — || November 1, 2005 || Mount Lemmon || Mount Lemmon Survey || FLO || align=right data-sort-value="0.78" | 780 m || 
|-id=566 bgcolor=#fefefe
| 348566 ||  || — || November 6, 2005 || Kitt Peak || Spacewatch || FLO || align=right data-sort-value="0.59" | 590 m || 
|-id=567 bgcolor=#d6d6d6
| 348567 ||  || — || November 2, 2005 || Socorro || LINEAR || — || align=right | 3.7 km || 
|-id=568 bgcolor=#fefefe
| 348568 ||  || — || November 10, 2005 || Kitt Peak || Spacewatch || — || align=right | 1.1 km || 
|-id=569 bgcolor=#d6d6d6
| 348569 ||  || — || November 1, 2005 || Apache Point || A. C. Becker || EUP || align=right | 4.1 km || 
|-id=570 bgcolor=#d6d6d6
| 348570 || 2005 WS || — || November 20, 2005 || La Silla || R. Behrend || VER || align=right | 4.0 km || 
|-id=571 bgcolor=#d6d6d6
| 348571 ||  || — || November 21, 2005 || Anderson Mesa || LONEOS || — || align=right | 5.2 km || 
|-id=572 bgcolor=#fefefe
| 348572 ||  || — || November 21, 2005 || Anderson Mesa || LONEOS || — || align=right data-sort-value="0.87" | 870 m || 
|-id=573 bgcolor=#fefefe
| 348573 ||  || — || September 30, 2005 || Mount Lemmon || Mount Lemmon Survey || FLO || align=right data-sort-value="0.63" | 630 m || 
|-id=574 bgcolor=#fefefe
| 348574 ||  || — || November 21, 2005 || Kitt Peak || Spacewatch || — || align=right | 1.5 km || 
|-id=575 bgcolor=#fefefe
| 348575 ||  || — || November 21, 2005 || Kitt Peak || Spacewatch || — || align=right data-sort-value="0.93" | 930 m || 
|-id=576 bgcolor=#fefefe
| 348576 ||  || — || November 22, 2005 || Kitt Peak || Spacewatch || NYS || align=right data-sort-value="0.58" | 580 m || 
|-id=577 bgcolor=#fefefe
| 348577 ||  || — || November 21, 2005 || Palomar || NEAT || — || align=right | 1.0 km || 
|-id=578 bgcolor=#fefefe
| 348578 ||  || — || November 26, 2005 || Kitt Peak || Spacewatch || — || align=right | 1.1 km || 
|-id=579 bgcolor=#fefefe
| 348579 ||  || — || November 28, 2005 || Mount Lemmon || Mount Lemmon Survey || NYS || align=right data-sort-value="0.68" | 680 m || 
|-id=580 bgcolor=#fefefe
| 348580 ||  || — || November 28, 2005 || Mount Lemmon || Mount Lemmon Survey || — || align=right data-sort-value="0.85" | 850 m || 
|-id=581 bgcolor=#fefefe
| 348581 ||  || — || November 25, 2005 || Kitt Peak || Spacewatch || — || align=right data-sort-value="0.93" | 930 m || 
|-id=582 bgcolor=#fefefe
| 348582 ||  || — || November 28, 2005 || Socorro || LINEAR || FLO || align=right data-sort-value="0.72" | 720 m || 
|-id=583 bgcolor=#fefefe
| 348583 ||  || — || November 28, 2005 || Socorro || LINEAR || V || align=right data-sort-value="0.78" | 780 m || 
|-id=584 bgcolor=#fefefe
| 348584 ||  || — || November 29, 2005 || Socorro || LINEAR || PHO || align=right | 1.6 km || 
|-id=585 bgcolor=#fefefe
| 348585 ||  || — || November 30, 2005 || Socorro || LINEAR || — || align=right data-sort-value="0.92" | 920 m || 
|-id=586 bgcolor=#fefefe
| 348586 ||  || — || November 29, 2005 || Socorro || LINEAR || FLO || align=right data-sort-value="0.75" | 750 m || 
|-id=587 bgcolor=#d6d6d6
| 348587 ||  || — || November 25, 2005 || Mount Lemmon || Mount Lemmon Survey || EOS || align=right | 2.3 km || 
|-id=588 bgcolor=#fefefe
| 348588 ||  || — || November 29, 2005 || Mount Lemmon || Mount Lemmon Survey || — || align=right data-sort-value="0.78" | 780 m || 
|-id=589 bgcolor=#fefefe
| 348589 ||  || — || November 25, 2005 || Kitt Peak || Spacewatch || — || align=right data-sort-value="0.68" | 680 m || 
|-id=590 bgcolor=#d6d6d6
| 348590 ||  || — || November 26, 2005 || Mount Lemmon || Mount Lemmon Survey || — || align=right | 2.8 km || 
|-id=591 bgcolor=#fefefe
| 348591 ||  || — || November 28, 2005 || Kitt Peak || Spacewatch || — || align=right data-sort-value="0.81" | 810 m || 
|-id=592 bgcolor=#fefefe
| 348592 ||  || — || November 28, 2005 || Kitt Peak || Spacewatch || — || align=right | 1.00 km || 
|-id=593 bgcolor=#E9E9E9
| 348593 ||  || — || November 28, 2005 || Palomar || NEAT || JUN || align=right | 1.4 km || 
|-id=594 bgcolor=#E9E9E9
| 348594 ||  || — || November 28, 2005 || Catalina || CSS || — || align=right | 2.2 km || 
|-id=595 bgcolor=#FFC2E0
| 348595 ||  || — || December 4, 2005 || Catalina || CSS || AMO || align=right data-sort-value="0.56" | 560 m || 
|-id=596 bgcolor=#fefefe
| 348596 ||  || — || December 1, 2005 || Socorro || LINEAR || NYS || align=right data-sort-value="0.87" | 870 m || 
|-id=597 bgcolor=#fefefe
| 348597 ||  || — || December 1, 2005 || Palomar || NEAT || — || align=right data-sort-value="0.94" | 940 m || 
|-id=598 bgcolor=#fefefe
| 348598 ||  || — || December 2, 2005 || Socorro || LINEAR || NYS || align=right data-sort-value="0.74" | 740 m || 
|-id=599 bgcolor=#fefefe
| 348599 ||  || — || December 2, 2005 || Socorro || LINEAR || — || align=right | 1.0 km || 
|-id=600 bgcolor=#fefefe
| 348600 ||  || — || December 1, 2005 || Socorro || LINEAR || — || align=right data-sort-value="0.99" | 990 m || 
|}

348601–348700 

|-bgcolor=#d6d6d6
| 348601 ||  || — || December 2, 2005 || Kitt Peak || Spacewatch || — || align=right | 3.8 km || 
|-id=602 bgcolor=#fefefe
| 348602 ||  || — || December 2, 2005 || Socorro || LINEAR || V || align=right data-sort-value="0.69" | 690 m || 
|-id=603 bgcolor=#fefefe
| 348603 ||  || — || November 30, 2005 || Kitt Peak || Spacewatch || MAS || align=right data-sort-value="0.67" | 670 m || 
|-id=604 bgcolor=#fefefe
| 348604 ||  || — || December 6, 2005 || Kitt Peak || Spacewatch || FLO || align=right data-sort-value="0.79" | 790 m || 
|-id=605 bgcolor=#fefefe
| 348605 ||  || — || December 2, 2005 || Mount Lemmon || Mount Lemmon Survey || — || align=right | 1.0 km || 
|-id=606 bgcolor=#fefefe
| 348606 ||  || — || December 7, 2005 || Kitt Peak || Spacewatch || — || align=right | 3.2 km || 
|-id=607 bgcolor=#d6d6d6
| 348607 ||  || — || October 27, 2005 || Mount Lemmon || Mount Lemmon Survey || — || align=right | 4.2 km || 
|-id=608 bgcolor=#d6d6d6
| 348608 ||  || — || December 6, 2005 || Catalina || CSS || — || align=right | 4.7 km || 
|-id=609 bgcolor=#E9E9E9
| 348609 ||  || — || December 1, 2005 || Kitt Peak || M. W. Buie || — || align=right | 1.3 km || 
|-id=610 bgcolor=#fefefe
| 348610 ||  || — || December 2, 2005 || Kitt Peak || Spacewatch || FLO || align=right data-sort-value="0.69" | 690 m || 
|-id=611 bgcolor=#d6d6d6
| 348611 ||  || — || December 2, 2005 || Mount Lemmon || Mount Lemmon Survey || KAR || align=right | 1.2 km || 
|-id=612 bgcolor=#FA8072
| 348612 ||  || — || December 21, 2005 || Catalina || CSS || — || align=right data-sort-value="0.77" | 770 m || 
|-id=613 bgcolor=#fefefe
| 348613 ||  || — || October 28, 2005 || Mount Lemmon || Mount Lemmon Survey || H || align=right data-sort-value="0.98" | 980 m || 
|-id=614 bgcolor=#fefefe
| 348614 ||  || — || December 21, 2005 || Kitt Peak || Spacewatch || — || align=right | 1.1 km || 
|-id=615 bgcolor=#fefefe
| 348615 ||  || — || December 22, 2005 || Kitt Peak || Spacewatch || — || align=right data-sort-value="0.67" | 670 m || 
|-id=616 bgcolor=#d6d6d6
| 348616 ||  || — || November 6, 2005 || Mount Lemmon || Mount Lemmon Survey || — || align=right | 4.5 km || 
|-id=617 bgcolor=#E9E9E9
| 348617 ||  || — || December 24, 2005 || Kitt Peak || Spacewatch || — || align=right | 2.2 km || 
|-id=618 bgcolor=#fefefe
| 348618 ||  || — || December 22, 2005 || Kitt Peak || Spacewatch || — || align=right | 2.6 km || 
|-id=619 bgcolor=#fefefe
| 348619 ||  || — || December 22, 2005 || Kitt Peak || Spacewatch || NYS || align=right data-sort-value="0.64" | 640 m || 
|-id=620 bgcolor=#fefefe
| 348620 ||  || — || December 26, 2005 || Mount Lemmon || Mount Lemmon Survey || NYS || align=right data-sort-value="0.61" | 610 m || 
|-id=621 bgcolor=#fefefe
| 348621 ||  || — || December 21, 2005 || Catalina || CSS || — || align=right | 1.00 km || 
|-id=622 bgcolor=#fefefe
| 348622 ||  || — || December 25, 2005 || Kitt Peak || Spacewatch || — || align=right data-sort-value="0.74" | 740 m || 
|-id=623 bgcolor=#fefefe
| 348623 ||  || — || December 25, 2005 || Mount Lemmon || Mount Lemmon Survey || V || align=right data-sort-value="0.72" | 720 m || 
|-id=624 bgcolor=#fefefe
| 348624 ||  || — || December 25, 2005 || Kitt Peak || Spacewatch || — || align=right data-sort-value="0.94" | 940 m || 
|-id=625 bgcolor=#fefefe
| 348625 ||  || — || December 26, 2005 || Kitt Peak || Spacewatch || V || align=right data-sort-value="0.82" | 820 m || 
|-id=626 bgcolor=#fefefe
| 348626 ||  || — || December 25, 2005 || Mount Lemmon || Mount Lemmon Survey || — || align=right data-sort-value="0.90" | 900 m || 
|-id=627 bgcolor=#fefefe
| 348627 ||  || — || December 26, 2005 || Mount Lemmon || Mount Lemmon Survey || V || align=right data-sort-value="0.75" | 750 m || 
|-id=628 bgcolor=#fefefe
| 348628 ||  || — || December 25, 2005 || Kitt Peak || Spacewatch || V || align=right data-sort-value="0.76" | 760 m || 
|-id=629 bgcolor=#fefefe
| 348629 ||  || — || December 25, 2005 || Kitt Peak || Spacewatch || NYS || align=right data-sort-value="0.52" | 520 m || 
|-id=630 bgcolor=#d6d6d6
| 348630 ||  || — || December 27, 2005 || Mount Lemmon || Mount Lemmon Survey || — || align=right | 3.7 km || 
|-id=631 bgcolor=#fefefe
| 348631 ||  || — || December 28, 2005 || Mount Lemmon || Mount Lemmon Survey || — || align=right | 1.1 km || 
|-id=632 bgcolor=#fefefe
| 348632 ||  || — || December 27, 2005 || Catalina || CSS || — || align=right data-sort-value="0.82" | 820 m || 
|-id=633 bgcolor=#fefefe
| 348633 ||  || — || December 25, 2005 || Mount Lemmon || Mount Lemmon Survey || MAS || align=right data-sort-value="0.57" | 570 m || 
|-id=634 bgcolor=#fefefe
| 348634 ||  || — || December 25, 2005 || Mount Lemmon || Mount Lemmon Survey || — || align=right data-sort-value="0.83" | 830 m || 
|-id=635 bgcolor=#fefefe
| 348635 ||  || — || December 28, 2005 || Mount Lemmon || Mount Lemmon Survey || MAS || align=right data-sort-value="0.85" | 850 m || 
|-id=636 bgcolor=#fefefe
| 348636 ||  || — || December 28, 2005 || Mount Lemmon || Mount Lemmon Survey || NYS || align=right data-sort-value="0.79" | 790 m || 
|-id=637 bgcolor=#fefefe
| 348637 ||  || — || December 24, 2005 || Kitt Peak || Spacewatch || — || align=right data-sort-value="0.80" | 800 m || 
|-id=638 bgcolor=#fefefe
| 348638 ||  || — || December 29, 2005 || Kitt Peak || Spacewatch || FLO || align=right | 2.4 km || 
|-id=639 bgcolor=#fefefe
| 348639 ||  || — || December 27, 2005 || Kitt Peak || Spacewatch || — || align=right data-sort-value="0.90" | 900 m || 
|-id=640 bgcolor=#fefefe
| 348640 ||  || — || December 28, 2005 || Kitt Peak || Spacewatch || — || align=right data-sort-value="0.71" | 710 m || 
|-id=641 bgcolor=#fefefe
| 348641 ||  || — || December 29, 2005 || Kitt Peak || Spacewatch || V || align=right data-sort-value="0.76" | 760 m || 
|-id=642 bgcolor=#fefefe
| 348642 ||  || — || December 30, 2005 || Socorro || LINEAR || H || align=right data-sort-value="0.90" | 900 m || 
|-id=643 bgcolor=#fefefe
| 348643 ||  || — || December 22, 2005 || Kitt Peak || Spacewatch || MAS || align=right data-sort-value="0.75" | 750 m || 
|-id=644 bgcolor=#fefefe
| 348644 ||  || — || December 29, 2005 || Socorro || LINEAR || PHO || align=right data-sort-value="0.92" | 920 m || 
|-id=645 bgcolor=#d6d6d6
| 348645 ||  || — || December 28, 2005 || Kitt Peak || Spacewatch || HYG || align=right | 2.7 km || 
|-id=646 bgcolor=#fefefe
| 348646 ||  || — || December 28, 2005 || Mount Lemmon || Mount Lemmon Survey || — || align=right | 1.2 km || 
|-id=647 bgcolor=#E9E9E9
| 348647 ||  || — || December 25, 2005 || Catalina || CSS || — || align=right | 1.8 km || 
|-id=648 bgcolor=#fefefe
| 348648 ||  || — || December 24, 2005 || Kitt Peak || Spacewatch || FLO || align=right data-sort-value="0.84" | 840 m || 
|-id=649 bgcolor=#fefefe
| 348649 ||  || — || December 25, 2005 || Mount Lemmon || Mount Lemmon Survey || — || align=right data-sort-value="0.68" | 680 m || 
|-id=650 bgcolor=#fefefe
| 348650 ||  || — || December 30, 2005 || Mount Lemmon || Mount Lemmon Survey || — || align=right data-sort-value="0.80" | 800 m || 
|-id=651 bgcolor=#fefefe
| 348651 ||  || — || December 30, 2005 || Mount Lemmon || Mount Lemmon Survey || NYS || align=right data-sort-value="0.74" | 740 m || 
|-id=652 bgcolor=#fefefe
| 348652 ||  || — || December 31, 2005 || Kitt Peak || Spacewatch || — || align=right data-sort-value="0.65" | 650 m || 
|-id=653 bgcolor=#fefefe
| 348653 ||  || — || December 30, 2005 || Kitt Peak || Spacewatch || — || align=right data-sort-value="0.76" | 760 m || 
|-id=654 bgcolor=#fefefe
| 348654 ||  || — || December 28, 2005 || Kitt Peak || Spacewatch || — || align=right data-sort-value="0.75" | 750 m || 
|-id=655 bgcolor=#fefefe
| 348655 ||  || — || December 25, 2005 || Kitt Peak || Spacewatch || — || align=right data-sort-value="0.82" | 820 m || 
|-id=656 bgcolor=#fefefe
| 348656 ||  || — || December 24, 2005 || Kitt Peak || Spacewatch || — || align=right | 2.4 km || 
|-id=657 bgcolor=#fefefe
| 348657 ||  || — || December 28, 2005 || Mount Lemmon || Mount Lemmon Survey || V || align=right data-sort-value="0.99" | 990 m || 
|-id=658 bgcolor=#fefefe
| 348658 ||  || — || December 29, 2005 || Kitt Peak || Spacewatch || NYS || align=right data-sort-value="0.69" | 690 m || 
|-id=659 bgcolor=#fefefe
| 348659 ||  || — || December 25, 2005 || Mount Lemmon || Mount Lemmon Survey || NYS || align=right data-sort-value="0.60" | 600 m || 
|-id=660 bgcolor=#fefefe
| 348660 ||  || — || January 4, 2006 || Catalina || CSS || — || align=right data-sort-value="0.94" | 940 m || 
|-id=661 bgcolor=#E9E9E9
| 348661 ||  || — || January 5, 2006 || Mount Lemmon || Mount Lemmon Survey || DOR || align=right | 3.1 km || 
|-id=662 bgcolor=#fefefe
| 348662 ||  || — || January 5, 2006 || Kitt Peak || Spacewatch || NYS || align=right data-sort-value="0.51" | 510 m || 
|-id=663 bgcolor=#fefefe
| 348663 ||  || — || January 5, 2006 || Mount Lemmon || Mount Lemmon Survey || — || align=right data-sort-value="0.99" | 990 m || 
|-id=664 bgcolor=#d6d6d6
| 348664 ||  || — || November 30, 2005 || Mount Lemmon || Mount Lemmon Survey || 628 || align=right | 2.2 km || 
|-id=665 bgcolor=#fefefe
| 348665 ||  || — || January 20, 2006 || Catalina || CSS || — || align=right | 1.8 km || 
|-id=666 bgcolor=#fefefe
| 348666 ||  || — || January 20, 2006 || Kitt Peak || Spacewatch || — || align=right data-sort-value="0.78" | 780 m || 
|-id=667 bgcolor=#fefefe
| 348667 ||  || — || January 21, 2006 || Kitt Peak || Spacewatch || — || align=right data-sort-value="0.89" | 890 m || 
|-id=668 bgcolor=#fefefe
| 348668 ||  || — || January 22, 2006 || Mount Lemmon || Mount Lemmon Survey || NYS || align=right data-sort-value="0.82" | 820 m || 
|-id=669 bgcolor=#fefefe
| 348669 ||  || — || January 22, 2006 || Mount Lemmon || Mount Lemmon Survey || V || align=right data-sort-value="0.80" | 800 m || 
|-id=670 bgcolor=#fefefe
| 348670 ||  || — || January 22, 2006 || Anderson Mesa || LONEOS || ERI || align=right | 1.8 km || 
|-id=671 bgcolor=#fefefe
| 348671 ||  || — || January 22, 2006 || Mount Lemmon || Mount Lemmon Survey || V || align=right data-sort-value="0.82" | 820 m || 
|-id=672 bgcolor=#fefefe
| 348672 ||  || — || January 25, 2006 || Kitt Peak || Spacewatch || — || align=right data-sort-value="0.97" | 970 m || 
|-id=673 bgcolor=#fefefe
| 348673 ||  || — || January 23, 2006 || Kitt Peak || Spacewatch || NYS || align=right data-sort-value="0.90" | 900 m || 
|-id=674 bgcolor=#fefefe
| 348674 ||  || — || January 22, 2006 || Catalina || CSS || — || align=right | 1.3 km || 
|-id=675 bgcolor=#fefefe
| 348675 ||  || — || January 22, 2006 || Catalina || CSS || PHO || align=right | 1.3 km || 
|-id=676 bgcolor=#fefefe
| 348676 ||  || — || January 22, 2006 || Mount Lemmon || Mount Lemmon Survey || NYS || align=right data-sort-value="0.66" | 660 m || 
|-id=677 bgcolor=#fefefe
| 348677 ||  || — || January 23, 2006 || Kitt Peak || Spacewatch || NYS || align=right data-sort-value="0.77" | 770 m || 
|-id=678 bgcolor=#E9E9E9
| 348678 ||  || — || October 7, 2005 || Mauna Kea || A. Boattini || — || align=right | 1.3 km || 
|-id=679 bgcolor=#fefefe
| 348679 ||  || — || January 23, 2006 || Kitt Peak || Spacewatch || NYS || align=right data-sort-value="0.92" | 920 m || 
|-id=680 bgcolor=#fefefe
| 348680 ||  || — || January 23, 2006 || Kitt Peak || Spacewatch || NYS || align=right data-sort-value="0.96" | 960 m || 
|-id=681 bgcolor=#fefefe
| 348681 ||  || — || January 23, 2006 || Kitt Peak || Spacewatch || NYS || align=right data-sort-value="0.66" | 660 m || 
|-id=682 bgcolor=#fefefe
| 348682 ||  || — || January 23, 2006 || Mount Lemmon || Mount Lemmon Survey || — || align=right data-sort-value="0.92" | 920 m || 
|-id=683 bgcolor=#fefefe
| 348683 ||  || — || January 25, 2006 || Kitt Peak || Spacewatch || MAS || align=right data-sort-value="0.66" | 660 m || 
|-id=684 bgcolor=#fefefe
| 348684 ||  || — || January 25, 2006 || Kitt Peak || Spacewatch || NYS || align=right data-sort-value="0.81" | 810 m || 
|-id=685 bgcolor=#fefefe
| 348685 ||  || — || January 25, 2006 || Kitt Peak || Spacewatch || MAS || align=right data-sort-value="0.63" | 630 m || 
|-id=686 bgcolor=#fefefe
| 348686 ||  || — || January 26, 2006 || Kitt Peak || Spacewatch || V || align=right data-sort-value="0.70" | 700 m || 
|-id=687 bgcolor=#fefefe
| 348687 ||  || — || January 7, 2006 || Mount Lemmon || Mount Lemmon Survey || FLO || align=right data-sort-value="0.97" | 970 m || 
|-id=688 bgcolor=#fefefe
| 348688 ||  || — || January 25, 2006 || Kitt Peak || Spacewatch || NYS || align=right data-sort-value="0.69" | 690 m || 
|-id=689 bgcolor=#d6d6d6
| 348689 ||  || — || October 24, 2005 || Mauna Kea || A. Boattini || SHU3:2 || align=right | 4.4 km || 
|-id=690 bgcolor=#fefefe
| 348690 ||  || — || January 25, 2006 || Kitt Peak || Spacewatch || NYS || align=right data-sort-value="0.66" | 660 m || 
|-id=691 bgcolor=#fefefe
| 348691 ||  || — || January 25, 2006 || Kitt Peak || Spacewatch || V || align=right data-sort-value="0.82" | 820 m || 
|-id=692 bgcolor=#fefefe
| 348692 ||  || — || January 25, 2006 || Kitt Peak || Spacewatch || — || align=right data-sort-value="0.92" | 920 m || 
|-id=693 bgcolor=#fefefe
| 348693 ||  || — || January 26, 2006 || Kitt Peak || Spacewatch || FLO || align=right data-sort-value="0.71" | 710 m || 
|-id=694 bgcolor=#fefefe
| 348694 ||  || — || January 27, 2006 || Mount Lemmon || Mount Lemmon Survey || NYS || align=right data-sort-value="0.64" | 640 m || 
|-id=695 bgcolor=#fefefe
| 348695 ||  || — || January 26, 2006 || Mount Lemmon || Mount Lemmon Survey || MAS || align=right data-sort-value="0.60" | 600 m || 
|-id=696 bgcolor=#fefefe
| 348696 ||  || — || January 27, 2006 || Mount Lemmon || Mount Lemmon Survey || NYS || align=right data-sort-value="0.52" | 520 m || 
|-id=697 bgcolor=#E9E9E9
| 348697 ||  || — || January 7, 2006 || Mount Lemmon || Mount Lemmon Survey || — || align=right | 2.7 km || 
|-id=698 bgcolor=#fefefe
| 348698 ||  || — || January 30, 2006 || Kitt Peak || Spacewatch || — || align=right data-sort-value="0.74" | 740 m || 
|-id=699 bgcolor=#fefefe
| 348699 ||  || — || January 31, 2006 || Kitt Peak || Spacewatch || MAS || align=right data-sort-value="0.78" | 780 m || 
|-id=700 bgcolor=#fefefe
| 348700 ||  || — || January 23, 2006 || Socorro || LINEAR || ERI || align=right | 1.5 km || 
|}

348701–348800 

|-bgcolor=#fefefe
| 348701 ||  || — || January 30, 2006 || Kitt Peak || Spacewatch || — || align=right data-sort-value="0.75" | 750 m || 
|-id=702 bgcolor=#fefefe
| 348702 ||  || — || January 31, 2006 || Kitt Peak || Spacewatch || NYS || align=right data-sort-value="0.86" | 860 m || 
|-id=703 bgcolor=#fefefe
| 348703 ||  || — || January 28, 2006 || Catalina || CSS || — || align=right | 1.1 km || 
|-id=704 bgcolor=#C2FFFF
| 348704 ||  || — || January 23, 2006 || Kitt Peak || Spacewatch || L5 || align=right | 11 km || 
|-id=705 bgcolor=#fefefe
| 348705 ||  || — || January 31, 2006 || Kitt Peak || Spacewatch || V || align=right data-sort-value="0.86" | 860 m || 
|-id=706 bgcolor=#fefefe
| 348706 ||  || — || January 21, 2006 || Mount Lemmon || Mount Lemmon Survey || MAS || align=right data-sort-value="0.69" | 690 m || 
|-id=707 bgcolor=#fefefe
| 348707 ||  || — || February 1, 2006 || Mount Lemmon || Mount Lemmon Survey || NYS || align=right data-sort-value="0.72" | 720 m || 
|-id=708 bgcolor=#fefefe
| 348708 ||  || — || February 4, 2006 || 7300 Observatory || W. K. Y. Yeung || — || align=right | 2.9 km || 
|-id=709 bgcolor=#fefefe
| 348709 ||  || — || February 2, 2006 || Kitt Peak || Spacewatch || MAS || align=right data-sort-value="0.82" | 820 m || 
|-id=710 bgcolor=#fefefe
| 348710 ||  || — || February 2, 2006 || Kitt Peak || Spacewatch || NYS || align=right data-sort-value="0.72" | 720 m || 
|-id=711 bgcolor=#E9E9E9
| 348711 ||  || — || February 2, 2006 || Kitt Peak || Spacewatch || — || align=right | 2.5 km || 
|-id=712 bgcolor=#fefefe
| 348712 ||  || — || February 7, 2006 || Mount Lemmon || Mount Lemmon Survey || — || align=right data-sort-value="0.88" | 880 m || 
|-id=713 bgcolor=#fefefe
| 348713 ||  || — || February 20, 2006 || Kitt Peak || Spacewatch || — || align=right | 1.1 km || 
|-id=714 bgcolor=#E9E9E9
| 348714 ||  || — || February 20, 2006 || Kitt Peak || Spacewatch || — || align=right | 1.5 km || 
|-id=715 bgcolor=#E9E9E9
| 348715 ||  || — || February 20, 2006 || Kitt Peak || Spacewatch || — || align=right | 2.2 km || 
|-id=716 bgcolor=#fefefe
| 348716 ||  || — || February 21, 2006 || Mount Lemmon || Mount Lemmon Survey || NYS || align=right data-sort-value="0.67" | 670 m || 
|-id=717 bgcolor=#fefefe
| 348717 ||  || — || February 23, 2006 || Kitt Peak || Spacewatch || — || align=right | 1.00 km || 
|-id=718 bgcolor=#fefefe
| 348718 ||  || — || February 20, 2006 || Kitt Peak || Spacewatch || — || align=right | 1.2 km || 
|-id=719 bgcolor=#d6d6d6
| 348719 ||  || — || February 21, 2006 || Anderson Mesa || LONEOS || — || align=right | 4.0 km || 
|-id=720 bgcolor=#fefefe
| 348720 ||  || — || February 23, 2006 || Eskridge || Farpoint Obs. || V || align=right data-sort-value="0.74" | 740 m || 
|-id=721 bgcolor=#E9E9E9
| 348721 ||  || — || February 20, 2006 || Kitt Peak || Spacewatch || — || align=right | 1.7 km || 
|-id=722 bgcolor=#E9E9E9
| 348722 ||  || — || February 21, 2006 || Mount Lemmon || Mount Lemmon Survey || — || align=right | 1.9 km || 
|-id=723 bgcolor=#E9E9E9
| 348723 ||  || — || March 21, 2002 || Kitt Peak || Spacewatch || — || align=right data-sort-value="0.95" | 950 m || 
|-id=724 bgcolor=#E9E9E9
| 348724 ||  || — || February 21, 2006 || Catalina || CSS || — || align=right | 1.5 km || 
|-id=725 bgcolor=#fefefe
| 348725 ||  || — || February 25, 2006 || Kitt Peak || Spacewatch || CLA || align=right | 1.7 km || 
|-id=726 bgcolor=#fefefe
| 348726 ||  || — || February 27, 2006 || Kitt Peak || Spacewatch || MAS || align=right data-sort-value="0.74" | 740 m || 
|-id=727 bgcolor=#fefefe
| 348727 ||  || — || February 27, 2006 || Mount Lemmon || Mount Lemmon Survey || — || align=right data-sort-value="0.90" | 900 m || 
|-id=728 bgcolor=#fefefe
| 348728 ||  || — || February 25, 2006 || Mount Lemmon || Mount Lemmon Survey || — || align=right data-sort-value="0.70" | 700 m || 
|-id=729 bgcolor=#fefefe
| 348729 ||  || — || March 5, 2006 || Kitt Peak || Spacewatch || — || align=right data-sort-value="0.95" | 950 m || 
|-id=730 bgcolor=#fefefe
| 348730 ||  || — || March 4, 2006 || Kitt Peak || Spacewatch || MAS || align=right data-sort-value="0.79" | 790 m || 
|-id=731 bgcolor=#fefefe
| 348731 ||  || — || March 4, 2006 || Kitt Peak || Spacewatch || MAS || align=right data-sort-value="0.75" | 750 m || 
|-id=732 bgcolor=#E9E9E9
| 348732 ||  || — || March 23, 2006 || Kitt Peak || Spacewatch || — || align=right | 1.0 km || 
|-id=733 bgcolor=#fefefe
| 348733 ||  || — || March 23, 2006 || Mount Lemmon || Mount Lemmon Survey || EUT || align=right data-sort-value="0.82" | 820 m || 
|-id=734 bgcolor=#E9E9E9
| 348734 ||  || — || March 23, 2006 || Mount Lemmon || Mount Lemmon Survey || — || align=right | 1.4 km || 
|-id=735 bgcolor=#E9E9E9
| 348735 ||  || — || March 24, 2006 || Mount Lemmon || Mount Lemmon Survey || — || align=right | 1.5 km || 
|-id=736 bgcolor=#fefefe
| 348736 ||  || — || March 28, 2006 || Lulin Observatory || Q.-z. Ye || — || align=right | 1.2 km || 
|-id=737 bgcolor=#fefefe
| 348737 ||  || — || March 26, 2006 || Mount Lemmon || Mount Lemmon Survey || NYS || align=right data-sort-value="0.78" | 780 m || 
|-id=738 bgcolor=#E9E9E9
| 348738 ||  || — || March 25, 2006 || Kitt Peak || Spacewatch || — || align=right | 1.5 km || 
|-id=739 bgcolor=#d6d6d6
| 348739 ||  || — || April 6, 2006 || Great Shefford || P. Birtwhistle || 3:2 || align=right | 5.1 km || 
|-id=740 bgcolor=#E9E9E9
| 348740 ||  || — || April 2, 2006 || Kitt Peak || Spacewatch || — || align=right | 1.7 km || 
|-id=741 bgcolor=#E9E9E9
| 348741 ||  || — || April 2, 2006 || Kitt Peak || Spacewatch || — || align=right | 1.5 km || 
|-id=742 bgcolor=#E9E9E9
| 348742 ||  || — || April 2, 2006 || Kitt Peak || Spacewatch || — || align=right | 1.2 km || 
|-id=743 bgcolor=#E9E9E9
| 348743 ||  || — || April 19, 2006 || Catalina || CSS || EUN || align=right | 1.7 km || 
|-id=744 bgcolor=#E9E9E9
| 348744 ||  || — || April 19, 2006 || Kitt Peak || Spacewatch || — || align=right | 1.6 km || 
|-id=745 bgcolor=#E9E9E9
| 348745 ||  || — || April 19, 2006 || Kitt Peak || Spacewatch || — || align=right | 1.2 km || 
|-id=746 bgcolor=#E9E9E9
| 348746 ||  || — || April 19, 2006 || Catalina || CSS || JUN || align=right | 1.2 km || 
|-id=747 bgcolor=#E9E9E9
| 348747 ||  || — || April 20, 2006 || Kitt Peak || Spacewatch || — || align=right | 2.0 km || 
|-id=748 bgcolor=#d6d6d6
| 348748 ||  || — || April 20, 2006 || Kitt Peak || Spacewatch || — || align=right | 3.7 km || 
|-id=749 bgcolor=#E9E9E9
| 348749 ||  || — || April 21, 2006 || Kitt Peak || Spacewatch || — || align=right data-sort-value="0.95" | 950 m || 
|-id=750 bgcolor=#E9E9E9
| 348750 ||  || — || April 21, 2006 || Kitt Peak || Spacewatch || — || align=right | 1.5 km || 
|-id=751 bgcolor=#fefefe
| 348751 ||  || — || April 24, 2006 || Mount Lemmon || Mount Lemmon Survey || — || align=right data-sort-value="0.57" | 570 m || 
|-id=752 bgcolor=#fefefe
| 348752 ||  || — || April 26, 2006 || Kitt Peak || Spacewatch || MAS || align=right data-sort-value="0.82" | 820 m || 
|-id=753 bgcolor=#E9E9E9
| 348753 ||  || — || April 20, 2006 || Catalina || CSS || — || align=right | 1.1 km || 
|-id=754 bgcolor=#E9E9E9
| 348754 ||  || — || April 8, 2006 || Kitt Peak || Spacewatch || — || align=right | 1.4 km || 
|-id=755 bgcolor=#E9E9E9
| 348755 ||  || — || April 24, 2006 || Kitt Peak || Spacewatch || — || align=right | 2.3 km || 
|-id=756 bgcolor=#E9E9E9
| 348756 ||  || — || April 25, 2006 || Kitt Peak || Spacewatch || WIT || align=right | 1.3 km || 
|-id=757 bgcolor=#E9E9E9
| 348757 ||  || — || April 26, 2006 || Kitt Peak || Spacewatch || — || align=right | 1.5 km || 
|-id=758 bgcolor=#E9E9E9
| 348758 ||  || — || April 29, 2006 || Kitt Peak || Spacewatch || — || align=right | 1.0 km || 
|-id=759 bgcolor=#E9E9E9
| 348759 ||  || — || April 29, 2006 || Kitt Peak || Spacewatch || — || align=right | 1.6 km || 
|-id=760 bgcolor=#E9E9E9
| 348760 ||  || — || April 30, 2006 || Kitt Peak || Spacewatch || — || align=right | 1.8 km || 
|-id=761 bgcolor=#E9E9E9
| 348761 ||  || — || April 30, 2006 || Kitt Peak || Spacewatch || — || align=right | 2.3 km || 
|-id=762 bgcolor=#E9E9E9
| 348762 ||  || — || April 29, 2006 || Siding Spring || SSS || MIT || align=right | 3.5 km || 
|-id=763 bgcolor=#E9E9E9
| 348763 ||  || — || April 26, 2006 || Mount Lemmon || Mount Lemmon Survey || — || align=right | 1.7 km || 
|-id=764 bgcolor=#E9E9E9
| 348764 ||  || — || May 2, 2006 || Kitt Peak || Spacewatch || — || align=right | 1.1 km || 
|-id=765 bgcolor=#fefefe
| 348765 ||  || — || May 3, 2006 || Mount Lemmon || Mount Lemmon Survey || MAS || align=right data-sort-value="0.85" | 850 m || 
|-id=766 bgcolor=#E9E9E9
| 348766 ||  || — || May 4, 2006 || Kitt Peak || Spacewatch || — || align=right | 1.7 km || 
|-id=767 bgcolor=#E9E9E9
| 348767 ||  || — || May 4, 2006 || Kitt Peak || Spacewatch || — || align=right | 3.1 km || 
|-id=768 bgcolor=#fefefe
| 348768 ||  || — || May 7, 2006 || Mount Lemmon || Mount Lemmon Survey || — || align=right | 1.1 km || 
|-id=769 bgcolor=#fefefe
| 348769 ||  || — || April 7, 2006 || Kitt Peak || Spacewatch || H || align=right data-sort-value="0.71" | 710 m || 
|-id=770 bgcolor=#E9E9E9
| 348770 ||  || — || May 6, 2006 || Kitt Peak || Spacewatch || — || align=right | 1.7 km || 
|-id=771 bgcolor=#E9E9E9
| 348771 ||  || — || May 17, 2006 || Palomar || NEAT || — || align=right | 1.4 km || 
|-id=772 bgcolor=#E9E9E9
| 348772 ||  || — || May 20, 2006 || Kitt Peak || Spacewatch || — || align=right | 2.3 km || 
|-id=773 bgcolor=#E9E9E9
| 348773 ||  || — || May 19, 2006 || Anderson Mesa || LONEOS || — || align=right | 2.2 km || 
|-id=774 bgcolor=#E9E9E9
| 348774 ||  || — || May 20, 2006 || Mount Lemmon || Mount Lemmon Survey || — || align=right | 2.6 km || 
|-id=775 bgcolor=#E9E9E9
| 348775 ||  || — || May 20, 2006 || Kitt Peak || Spacewatch || — || align=right | 2.9 km || 
|-id=776 bgcolor=#FFC2E0
| 348776 ||  || — || May 24, 2006 || Catalina || CSS || APO || align=right data-sort-value="0.54" | 540 m || 
|-id=777 bgcolor=#E9E9E9
| 348777 ||  || — || May 21, 2006 || Kitt Peak || Spacewatch || — || align=right | 2.1 km || 
|-id=778 bgcolor=#E9E9E9
| 348778 ||  || — || May 21, 2006 || Kitt Peak || Spacewatch || — || align=right data-sort-value="0.85" | 850 m || 
|-id=779 bgcolor=#E9E9E9
| 348779 ||  || — || May 21, 2006 || Kitt Peak || Spacewatch || — || align=right | 1.4 km || 
|-id=780 bgcolor=#E9E9E9
| 348780 ||  || — || May 22, 2006 || Kitt Peak || Spacewatch || — || align=right | 3.4 km || 
|-id=781 bgcolor=#E9E9E9
| 348781 ||  || — || May 22, 2006 || Kitt Peak || Spacewatch || — || align=right | 1.2 km || 
|-id=782 bgcolor=#E9E9E9
| 348782 ||  || — || May 22, 2006 || Kitt Peak || Spacewatch || GEF || align=right | 1.2 km || 
|-id=783 bgcolor=#E9E9E9
| 348783 ||  || — || May 24, 2006 || Anderson Mesa || LONEOS || ADE || align=right | 2.5 km || 
|-id=784 bgcolor=#E9E9E9
| 348784 ||  || — || May 31, 2006 || Mount Lemmon || Mount Lemmon Survey || — || align=right | 1.7 km || 
|-id=785 bgcolor=#d6d6d6
| 348785 ||  || — || July 21, 2006 || Catalina || CSS || — || align=right | 3.9 km || 
|-id=786 bgcolor=#d6d6d6
| 348786 ||  || — || July 18, 2006 || Siding Spring || SSS || — || align=right | 2.6 km || 
|-id=787 bgcolor=#C2FFFF
| 348787 ||  || — || August 12, 2006 || Palomar || NEAT || L4 || align=right | 15 km || 
|-id=788 bgcolor=#d6d6d6
| 348788 ||  || — || August 12, 2006 || Palomar || NEAT || ALA || align=right | 5.4 km || 
|-id=789 bgcolor=#fefefe
| 348789 ||  || — || August 13, 2006 || Palomar || NEAT || FLO || align=right data-sort-value="0.64" | 640 m || 
|-id=790 bgcolor=#d6d6d6
| 348790 ||  || — || May 10, 2006 || Mount Lemmon || Mount Lemmon Survey || — || align=right | 2.9 km || 
|-id=791 bgcolor=#E9E9E9
| 348791 ||  || — || August 15, 2006 || Palomar || NEAT || — || align=right | 1.9 km || 
|-id=792 bgcolor=#fefefe
| 348792 ||  || — || August 12, 2006 || Lulin Observatory || H.-C. Lin, Q.-z. Ye || — || align=right | 1.2 km || 
|-id=793 bgcolor=#E9E9E9
| 348793 ||  || — || August 17, 2006 || Palomar || NEAT || — || align=right | 2.6 km || 
|-id=794 bgcolor=#E9E9E9
| 348794 ||  || — || August 19, 2006 || Kitt Peak || Spacewatch || — || align=right | 2.6 km || 
|-id=795 bgcolor=#fefefe
| 348795 ||  || — || August 19, 2006 || Reedy Creek || J. Broughton || KLI || align=right | 2.5 km || 
|-id=796 bgcolor=#fefefe
| 348796 ||  || — || July 18, 2006 || Mount Lemmon || Mount Lemmon Survey || — || align=right data-sort-value="0.97" | 970 m || 
|-id=797 bgcolor=#fefefe
| 348797 ||  || — || August 17, 2006 || Palomar || NEAT || FLO || align=right data-sort-value="0.71" | 710 m || 
|-id=798 bgcolor=#fefefe
| 348798 ||  || — || August 20, 2006 || Palomar || NEAT || — || align=right | 2.0 km || 
|-id=799 bgcolor=#d6d6d6
| 348799 ||  || — || August 23, 2006 || Antares || ARO || — || align=right | 3.1 km || 
|-id=800 bgcolor=#d6d6d6
| 348800 ||  || — || August 18, 2006 || Anderson Mesa || LONEOS || — || align=right | 4.2 km || 
|}

348801–348900 

|-bgcolor=#d6d6d6
| 348801 ||  || — || July 31, 2006 || Siding Spring || SSS || EUP || align=right | 4.1 km || 
|-id=802 bgcolor=#fefefe
| 348802 ||  || — || August 17, 2006 || Palomar || NEAT || CIM || align=right | 2.8 km || 
|-id=803 bgcolor=#d6d6d6
| 348803 ||  || — || August 28, 2006 || Catalina || CSS || — || align=right | 2.7 km || 
|-id=804 bgcolor=#fefefe
| 348804 ||  || — || August 27, 2006 || Anderson Mesa || LONEOS || — || align=right | 1.4 km || 
|-id=805 bgcolor=#d6d6d6
| 348805 ||  || — || August 16, 2006 || Palomar || NEAT || TIR || align=right | 3.1 km || 
|-id=806 bgcolor=#fefefe
| 348806 ||  || — || August 17, 2006 || Palomar || NEAT || H || align=right data-sort-value="0.80" | 800 m || 
|-id=807 bgcolor=#d6d6d6
| 348807 ||  || — || August 17, 2006 || Palomar || NEAT || — || align=right | 3.5 km || 
|-id=808 bgcolor=#d6d6d6
| 348808 ||  || — || August 29, 2006 || Anderson Mesa || LONEOS || — || align=right | 4.2 km || 
|-id=809 bgcolor=#d6d6d6
| 348809 ||  || — || August 19, 2006 || Kitt Peak || Spacewatch || — || align=right | 2.8 km || 
|-id=810 bgcolor=#E9E9E9
| 348810 ||  || — || August 29, 2006 || Anderson Mesa || LONEOS || — || align=right | 2.2 km || 
|-id=811 bgcolor=#d6d6d6
| 348811 ||  || — || August 29, 2006 || Anderson Mesa || LONEOS || — || align=right | 4.4 km || 
|-id=812 bgcolor=#E9E9E9
| 348812 ||  || — || August 29, 2006 || Lulin || H.-C. Lin, Q.-z. Ye || — || align=right | 2.0 km || 
|-id=813 bgcolor=#d6d6d6
| 348813 ||  || — || August 19, 2006 || Kitt Peak || Spacewatch || — || align=right | 3.1 km || 
|-id=814 bgcolor=#d6d6d6
| 348814 ||  || — || August 19, 2006 || Kitt Peak || Spacewatch || — || align=right | 2.2 km || 
|-id=815 bgcolor=#d6d6d6
| 348815 ||  || — || September 1, 2006 || Socorro || LINEAR || BRA || align=right | 2.1 km || 
|-id=816 bgcolor=#d6d6d6
| 348816 ||  || — || September 14, 2006 || Kitt Peak || Spacewatch || — || align=right | 2.3 km || 
|-id=817 bgcolor=#d6d6d6
| 348817 ||  || — || September 14, 2006 || Palomar || NEAT || TIR || align=right | 3.0 km || 
|-id=818 bgcolor=#d6d6d6
| 348818 ||  || — || August 29, 2006 || Anderson Mesa || LONEOS || EOS || align=right | 2.8 km || 
|-id=819 bgcolor=#d6d6d6
| 348819 ||  || — || September 14, 2006 || Palomar || NEAT || — || align=right | 4.1 km || 
|-id=820 bgcolor=#fefefe
| 348820 ||  || — || September 15, 2006 || Kitt Peak || Spacewatch || NYS || align=right data-sort-value="0.62" | 620 m || 
|-id=821 bgcolor=#d6d6d6
| 348821 ||  || — || September 12, 2006 || Catalina || CSS || LUT || align=right | 5.9 km || 
|-id=822 bgcolor=#d6d6d6
| 348822 ||  || — || September 14, 2006 || Kitt Peak || Spacewatch || THM || align=right | 2.4 km || 
|-id=823 bgcolor=#d6d6d6
| 348823 ||  || — || September 14, 2006 || Kitt Peak || Spacewatch || — || align=right | 2.2 km || 
|-id=824 bgcolor=#d6d6d6
| 348824 ||  || — || September 14, 2006 || Kitt Peak || Spacewatch || — || align=right | 2.8 km || 
|-id=825 bgcolor=#d6d6d6
| 348825 ||  || — || September 14, 2006 || Kitt Peak || Spacewatch || — || align=right | 2.7 km || 
|-id=826 bgcolor=#d6d6d6
| 348826 ||  || — || September 14, 2006 || Kitt Peak || Spacewatch || — || align=right | 3.3 km || 
|-id=827 bgcolor=#E9E9E9
| 348827 ||  || — || September 15, 2006 || Kitt Peak || Spacewatch || — || align=right | 2.1 km || 
|-id=828 bgcolor=#d6d6d6
| 348828 ||  || — || September 15, 2006 || Kitt Peak || Spacewatch || — || align=right | 2.5 km || 
|-id=829 bgcolor=#d6d6d6
| 348829 ||  || — || September 14, 2006 || Catalina || CSS || — || align=right | 3.9 km || 
|-id=830 bgcolor=#d6d6d6
| 348830 ||  || — || September 15, 2006 || Kitt Peak || Spacewatch || — || align=right | 2.4 km || 
|-id=831 bgcolor=#d6d6d6
| 348831 ||  || — || September 15, 2006 || Kitt Peak || Spacewatch || THM || align=right | 2.4 km || 
|-id=832 bgcolor=#d6d6d6
| 348832 ||  || — || September 15, 2006 || Kitt Peak || Spacewatch || — || align=right | 3.4 km || 
|-id=833 bgcolor=#d6d6d6
| 348833 ||  || — || September 15, 2006 || Kitt Peak || Spacewatch || — || align=right | 2.3 km || 
|-id=834 bgcolor=#d6d6d6
| 348834 ||  || — || September 15, 2006 || Kitt Peak || Spacewatch || — || align=right | 2.7 km || 
|-id=835 bgcolor=#d6d6d6
| 348835 ||  || — || August 16, 2006 || Palomar || NEAT || — || align=right | 4.1 km || 
|-id=836 bgcolor=#d6d6d6
| 348836 ||  || — || September 14, 2006 || Mauna Kea || J. Masiero || — || align=right | 2.4 km || 
|-id=837 bgcolor=#d6d6d6
| 348837 ||  || — || September 14, 2006 || Mauna Kea || J. Masiero || — || align=right | 2.6 km || 
|-id=838 bgcolor=#d6d6d6
| 348838 ||  || — || September 14, 2006 || Kitt Peak || Spacewatch || EOS || align=right | 2.5 km || 
|-id=839 bgcolor=#d6d6d6
| 348839 ||  || — || September 16, 2006 || Catalina || CSS || — || align=right | 3.2 km || 
|-id=840 bgcolor=#d6d6d6
| 348840 ||  || — || September 18, 2006 || Kitt Peak || Spacewatch || TEL || align=right | 1.6 km || 
|-id=841 bgcolor=#d6d6d6
| 348841 ||  || — || September 16, 2006 || Kitt Peak || Spacewatch || EOS || align=right | 2.2 km || 
|-id=842 bgcolor=#d6d6d6
| 348842 ||  || — || September 17, 2006 || Catalina || CSS || HYG || align=right | 3.5 km || 
|-id=843 bgcolor=#d6d6d6
| 348843 ||  || — || September 18, 2006 || Catalina || CSS || — || align=right | 4.3 km || 
|-id=844 bgcolor=#d6d6d6
| 348844 ||  || — || September 17, 2006 || Kitt Peak || Spacewatch || — || align=right | 2.9 km || 
|-id=845 bgcolor=#E9E9E9
| 348845 ||  || — || September 17, 2006 || Anderson Mesa || LONEOS || — || align=right | 4.0 km || 
|-id=846 bgcolor=#d6d6d6
| 348846 ||  || — || September 18, 2006 || Catalina || CSS || — || align=right | 2.3 km || 
|-id=847 bgcolor=#d6d6d6
| 348847 ||  || — || September 18, 2006 || Catalina || CSS || — || align=right | 4.2 km || 
|-id=848 bgcolor=#d6d6d6
| 348848 ||  || — || September 16, 2006 || Catalina || CSS || — || align=right | 4.0 km || 
|-id=849 bgcolor=#E9E9E9
| 348849 ||  || — || September 19, 2006 || Kitt Peak || Spacewatch || KON || align=right | 2.6 km || 
|-id=850 bgcolor=#E9E9E9
| 348850 ||  || — || September 19, 2006 || Kitt Peak || Spacewatch || — || align=right data-sort-value="0.98" | 980 m || 
|-id=851 bgcolor=#d6d6d6
| 348851 ||  || — || September 17, 2006 || Catalina || CSS || — || align=right | 4.7 km || 
|-id=852 bgcolor=#d6d6d6
| 348852 ||  || — || September 18, 2006 || Kitt Peak || Spacewatch || EOS || align=right | 1.8 km || 
|-id=853 bgcolor=#d6d6d6
| 348853 ||  || — || September 18, 2006 || Kitt Peak || Spacewatch || — || align=right | 2.8 km || 
|-id=854 bgcolor=#d6d6d6
| 348854 ||  || — || September 18, 2006 || Kitt Peak || Spacewatch || — || align=right | 2.8 km || 
|-id=855 bgcolor=#d6d6d6
| 348855 ||  || — || September 18, 2006 || Kitt Peak || Spacewatch || — || align=right | 3.0 km || 
|-id=856 bgcolor=#d6d6d6
| 348856 ||  || — || September 17, 2006 || Catalina || CSS || TIR || align=right | 3.3 km || 
|-id=857 bgcolor=#d6d6d6
| 348857 ||  || — || September 17, 2006 || Catalina || CSS || — || align=right | 4.3 km || 
|-id=858 bgcolor=#d6d6d6
| 348858 ||  || — || September 17, 2006 || Catalina || CSS || — || align=right | 3.1 km || 
|-id=859 bgcolor=#d6d6d6
| 348859 ||  || — || September 17, 2006 || Catalina || CSS || — || align=right | 3.6 km || 
|-id=860 bgcolor=#d6d6d6
| 348860 ||  || — || September 22, 2006 || Anderson Mesa || LONEOS || — || align=right | 3.8 km || 
|-id=861 bgcolor=#d6d6d6
| 348861 ||  || — || September 16, 2006 || Catalina || CSS || — || align=right | 4.3 km || 
|-id=862 bgcolor=#d6d6d6
| 348862 ||  || — || September 17, 2006 || Catalina || CSS || EOS || align=right | 1.8 km || 
|-id=863 bgcolor=#d6d6d6
| 348863 ||  || — || September 20, 2006 || Palomar || NEAT || — || align=right | 3.4 km || 
|-id=864 bgcolor=#d6d6d6
| 348864 ||  || — || September 21, 2006 || Anderson Mesa || LONEOS || — || align=right | 4.2 km || 
|-id=865 bgcolor=#d6d6d6
| 348865 ||  || — || September 25, 2006 || Anderson Mesa || LONEOS || — || align=right | 3.1 km || 
|-id=866 bgcolor=#d6d6d6
| 348866 ||  || — || September 19, 2006 || Kitt Peak || Spacewatch || HYG || align=right | 1.9 km || 
|-id=867 bgcolor=#d6d6d6
| 348867 ||  || — || September 15, 2006 || Kitt Peak || Spacewatch || EOS || align=right | 2.6 km || 
|-id=868 bgcolor=#d6d6d6
| 348868 ||  || — || September 19, 2006 || Catalina || CSS || — || align=right | 3.5 km || 
|-id=869 bgcolor=#d6d6d6
| 348869 ||  || — || September 23, 2006 || Kitt Peak || Spacewatch || EMA || align=right | 4.1 km || 
|-id=870 bgcolor=#d6d6d6
| 348870 ||  || — || September 23, 2006 || Kitt Peak || Spacewatch || — || align=right | 3.5 km || 
|-id=871 bgcolor=#d6d6d6
| 348871 ||  || — || September 24, 2006 || Kitt Peak || Spacewatch || THM || align=right | 2.2 km || 
|-id=872 bgcolor=#d6d6d6
| 348872 ||  || — || September 25, 2006 || Kitt Peak || Spacewatch || — || align=right | 3.0 km || 
|-id=873 bgcolor=#E9E9E9
| 348873 ||  || — || September 25, 2006 || Anderson Mesa || LONEOS || — || align=right | 1.9 km || 
|-id=874 bgcolor=#d6d6d6
| 348874 ||  || — || September 24, 2006 || Kitt Peak || Spacewatch || THM || align=right | 2.2 km || 
|-id=875 bgcolor=#d6d6d6
| 348875 ||  || — || September 24, 2006 || Kitt Peak || Spacewatch || — || align=right | 2.4 km || 
|-id=876 bgcolor=#d6d6d6
| 348876 ||  || — || September 24, 2006 || Kitt Peak || Spacewatch || — || align=right | 2.7 km || 
|-id=877 bgcolor=#d6d6d6
| 348877 ||  || — || September 25, 2006 || Kitt Peak || Spacewatch || — || align=right | 2.8 km || 
|-id=878 bgcolor=#d6d6d6
| 348878 ||  || — || September 25, 2006 || Anderson Mesa || LONEOS || — || align=right | 4.5 km || 
|-id=879 bgcolor=#d6d6d6
| 348879 ||  || — || September 26, 2006 || Mount Lemmon || Mount Lemmon Survey || THM || align=right | 1.8 km || 
|-id=880 bgcolor=#d6d6d6
| 348880 ||  || — || September 18, 2006 || Kitt Peak || Spacewatch || — || align=right | 2.9 km || 
|-id=881 bgcolor=#fefefe
| 348881 ||  || — || September 29, 2006 || Kitami || K. Endate || FLO || align=right data-sort-value="0.67" | 670 m || 
|-id=882 bgcolor=#d6d6d6
| 348882 ||  || — || September 18, 2006 || Kitt Peak || Spacewatch || — || align=right | 3.1 km || 
|-id=883 bgcolor=#d6d6d6
| 348883 ||  || — || September 18, 2006 || Kitt Peak || Spacewatch || — || align=right | 2.5 km || 
|-id=884 bgcolor=#d6d6d6
| 348884 ||  || — || September 26, 2006 || Kitt Peak || Spacewatch || EOS || align=right | 1.9 km || 
|-id=885 bgcolor=#d6d6d6
| 348885 ||  || — || September 26, 2006 || Kitt Peak || Spacewatch || KOR || align=right | 1.3 km || 
|-id=886 bgcolor=#d6d6d6
| 348886 ||  || — || September 26, 2006 || Kitt Peak || Spacewatch || — || align=right | 3.3 km || 
|-id=887 bgcolor=#d6d6d6
| 348887 ||  || — || September 26, 2006 || Kitt Peak || Spacewatch || — || align=right | 2.5 km || 
|-id=888 bgcolor=#d6d6d6
| 348888 ||  || — || September 26, 2006 || Kitt Peak || Spacewatch || — || align=right | 2.4 km || 
|-id=889 bgcolor=#d6d6d6
| 348889 ||  || — || September 26, 2006 || Kitt Peak || Spacewatch || EOS || align=right | 2.2 km || 
|-id=890 bgcolor=#E9E9E9
| 348890 ||  || — || September 26, 2006 || Catalina || CSS || — || align=right | 1.2 km || 
|-id=891 bgcolor=#fefefe
| 348891 ||  || — || September 27, 2006 || Mount Lemmon || Mount Lemmon Survey || V || align=right data-sort-value="0.59" | 590 m || 
|-id=892 bgcolor=#d6d6d6
| 348892 ||  || — || September 25, 2006 || Kitt Peak || Spacewatch || HYG || align=right | 2.4 km || 
|-id=893 bgcolor=#d6d6d6
| 348893 ||  || — || September 26, 2006 || Mount Lemmon || Mount Lemmon Survey || — || align=right | 2.7 km || 
|-id=894 bgcolor=#d6d6d6
| 348894 ||  || — || September 27, 2006 || Kitt Peak || Spacewatch || — || align=right | 3.2 km || 
|-id=895 bgcolor=#d6d6d6
| 348895 ||  || — || September 28, 2006 || Kitt Peak || Spacewatch || THM || align=right | 2.4 km || 
|-id=896 bgcolor=#d6d6d6
| 348896 ||  || — || September 28, 2006 || Kitt Peak || Spacewatch || — || align=right | 3.1 km || 
|-id=897 bgcolor=#d6d6d6
| 348897 ||  || — || September 28, 2006 || Kitt Peak || Spacewatch || VER || align=right | 2.7 km || 
|-id=898 bgcolor=#d6d6d6
| 348898 ||  || — || September 28, 2006 || Kitt Peak || Spacewatch || — || align=right | 3.7 km || 
|-id=899 bgcolor=#d6d6d6
| 348899 ||  || — || September 28, 2006 || Kitt Peak || Spacewatch || CHA || align=right | 2.0 km || 
|-id=900 bgcolor=#d6d6d6
| 348900 ||  || — || September 30, 2006 || Mount Lemmon || Mount Lemmon Survey || — || align=right | 3.1 km || 
|}

348901–349000 

|-bgcolor=#d6d6d6
| 348901 ||  || — || September 30, 2006 || Mount Lemmon || Mount Lemmon Survey || — || align=right | 2.8 km || 
|-id=902 bgcolor=#d6d6d6
| 348902 ||  || — || September 30, 2006 || Catalina || CSS || EOS || align=right | 2.2 km || 
|-id=903 bgcolor=#d6d6d6
| 348903 ||  || — || September 17, 2006 || Catalina || CSS || HYG || align=right | 2.9 km || 
|-id=904 bgcolor=#d6d6d6
| 348904 ||  || — || September 16, 2006 || Apache Point || A. C. Becker || — || align=right | 4.2 km || 
|-id=905 bgcolor=#d6d6d6
| 348905 ||  || — || September 25, 2006 || Kitt Peak || Spacewatch || — || align=right | 2.9 km || 
|-id=906 bgcolor=#d6d6d6
| 348906 ||  || — || September 25, 2006 || Mount Lemmon || Mount Lemmon Survey || — || align=right | 3.5 km || 
|-id=907 bgcolor=#d6d6d6
| 348907 ||  || — || September 17, 2006 || Kitt Peak || Spacewatch || — || align=right | 2.7 km || 
|-id=908 bgcolor=#d6d6d6
| 348908 ||  || — || September 18, 2006 || Kitt Peak || Spacewatch || — || align=right | 2.9 km || 
|-id=909 bgcolor=#d6d6d6
| 348909 ||  || — || September 18, 2006 || Catalina || CSS || — || align=right | 3.4 km || 
|-id=910 bgcolor=#d6d6d6
| 348910 ||  || — || September 30, 2006 || Mount Lemmon || Mount Lemmon Survey || — || align=right | 4.5 km || 
|-id=911 bgcolor=#d6d6d6
| 348911 ||  || — || September 19, 2006 || Catalina || CSS || — || align=right | 2.7 km || 
|-id=912 bgcolor=#d6d6d6
| 348912 ||  || — || October 11, 2006 || Kitt Peak || Spacewatch || — || align=right | 2.8 km || 
|-id=913 bgcolor=#d6d6d6
| 348913 ||  || — || October 11, 2006 || Kitt Peak || Spacewatch || URS || align=right | 3.2 km || 
|-id=914 bgcolor=#d6d6d6
| 348914 ||  || — || October 11, 2006 || Kitt Peak || Spacewatch || CRO || align=right | 3.2 km || 
|-id=915 bgcolor=#d6d6d6
| 348915 ||  || — || October 4, 2006 || Mount Lemmon || Mount Lemmon Survey || — || align=right | 3.7 km || 
|-id=916 bgcolor=#d6d6d6
| 348916 ||  || — || July 22, 2006 || Mount Lemmon || Mount Lemmon Survey || — || align=right | 2.6 km || 
|-id=917 bgcolor=#d6d6d6
| 348917 ||  || — || October 11, 2006 || Kitt Peak || Spacewatch || HYG || align=right | 2.7 km || 
|-id=918 bgcolor=#E9E9E9
| 348918 ||  || — || October 11, 2006 || Kitt Peak || Spacewatch || — || align=right | 2.1 km || 
|-id=919 bgcolor=#E9E9E9
| 348919 ||  || — || October 11, 2006 || Kitt Peak || Spacewatch || — || align=right | 1.6 km || 
|-id=920 bgcolor=#d6d6d6
| 348920 ||  || — || October 4, 2006 || Mount Lemmon || Mount Lemmon Survey || — || align=right | 3.1 km || 
|-id=921 bgcolor=#fefefe
| 348921 ||  || — || October 12, 2006 || Kitt Peak || Spacewatch || — || align=right data-sort-value="0.67" | 670 m || 
|-id=922 bgcolor=#E9E9E9
| 348922 ||  || — || October 12, 2006 || Kitt Peak || Spacewatch || — || align=right | 2.4 km || 
|-id=923 bgcolor=#d6d6d6
| 348923 ||  || — || September 25, 2006 || Mount Lemmon || Mount Lemmon Survey || — || align=right | 3.6 km || 
|-id=924 bgcolor=#d6d6d6
| 348924 ||  || — || October 12, 2006 || Kitt Peak || Spacewatch || HYG || align=right | 3.3 km || 
|-id=925 bgcolor=#d6d6d6
| 348925 ||  || — || October 12, 2006 || Kitt Peak || Spacewatch || THM || align=right | 2.4 km || 
|-id=926 bgcolor=#d6d6d6
| 348926 ||  || — || October 12, 2006 || Kitt Peak || Spacewatch || — || align=right | 4.2 km || 
|-id=927 bgcolor=#d6d6d6
| 348927 ||  || — || July 21, 2006 || Mount Lemmon || Mount Lemmon Survey || — || align=right | 2.6 km || 
|-id=928 bgcolor=#d6d6d6
| 348928 ||  || — || October 12, 2006 || Palomar || NEAT || — || align=right | 4.6 km || 
|-id=929 bgcolor=#d6d6d6
| 348929 ||  || — || October 12, 2006 || Kitt Peak || Spacewatch || ALA || align=right | 5.6 km || 
|-id=930 bgcolor=#d6d6d6
| 348930 ||  || — || October 12, 2006 || Kitt Peak || Spacewatch || — || align=right | 3.2 km || 
|-id=931 bgcolor=#d6d6d6
| 348931 ||  || — || October 12, 2006 || Palomar || NEAT || LIX || align=right | 4.3 km || 
|-id=932 bgcolor=#d6d6d6
| 348932 ||  || — || October 15, 2006 || Catalina || CSS || — || align=right | 3.4 km || 
|-id=933 bgcolor=#d6d6d6
| 348933 ||  || — || October 11, 2006 || Palomar || NEAT || — || align=right | 3.6 km || 
|-id=934 bgcolor=#d6d6d6
| 348934 ||  || — || October 11, 2006 || Palomar || NEAT || — || align=right | 3.4 km || 
|-id=935 bgcolor=#d6d6d6
| 348935 ||  || — || September 28, 2006 || Catalina || CSS || — || align=right | 2.9 km || 
|-id=936 bgcolor=#d6d6d6
| 348936 ||  || — || October 11, 2006 || Palomar || NEAT || TIR || align=right | 2.6 km || 
|-id=937 bgcolor=#d6d6d6
| 348937 ||  || — || October 11, 2006 || Palomar || NEAT || EOS || align=right | 4.4 km || 
|-id=938 bgcolor=#d6d6d6
| 348938 ||  || — || October 11, 2006 || Palomar || NEAT || — || align=right | 3.5 km || 
|-id=939 bgcolor=#d6d6d6
| 348939 ||  || — || October 11, 2006 || Palomar || NEAT || — || align=right | 3.4 km || 
|-id=940 bgcolor=#d6d6d6
| 348940 ||  || — || October 11, 2006 || Palomar || NEAT || — || align=right | 3.5 km || 
|-id=941 bgcolor=#d6d6d6
| 348941 ||  || — || October 11, 2006 || Palomar || NEAT || — || align=right | 3.3 km || 
|-id=942 bgcolor=#d6d6d6
| 348942 ||  || — || October 15, 2006 || Kitt Peak || Spacewatch || — || align=right | 3.2 km || 
|-id=943 bgcolor=#E9E9E9
| 348943 ||  || — || October 2, 2006 || Mount Lemmon || Mount Lemmon Survey || — || align=right | 2.3 km || 
|-id=944 bgcolor=#d6d6d6
| 348944 ||  || — || September 30, 2006 || Mount Lemmon || Mount Lemmon Survey || CRO || align=right | 3.2 km || 
|-id=945 bgcolor=#E9E9E9
| 348945 ||  || — || October 12, 2006 || Kitt Peak || Spacewatch || — || align=right data-sort-value="0.98" | 980 m || 
|-id=946 bgcolor=#E9E9E9
| 348946 ||  || — || October 13, 2006 || Kitt Peak || Spacewatch || — || align=right | 1.3 km || 
|-id=947 bgcolor=#d6d6d6
| 348947 ||  || — || October 15, 2006 || Kitt Peak || Spacewatch || KAR || align=right | 1.1 km || 
|-id=948 bgcolor=#d6d6d6
| 348948 ||  || — || October 15, 2006 || Kitt Peak || Spacewatch || THM || align=right | 2.7 km || 
|-id=949 bgcolor=#E9E9E9
| 348949 ||  || — || October 15, 2006 || Catalina || CSS || NEM || align=right | 2.6 km || 
|-id=950 bgcolor=#d6d6d6
| 348950 ||  || — || October 1, 2006 || Apache Point || A. C. Becker || — || align=right | 4.2 km || 
|-id=951 bgcolor=#d6d6d6
| 348951 ||  || — || October 11, 2006 || Apache Point || A. C. Becker || — || align=right | 2.9 km || 
|-id=952 bgcolor=#d6d6d6
| 348952 ||  || — || September 28, 2006 || Kitt Peak || Spacewatch || — || align=right | 3.0 km || 
|-id=953 bgcolor=#d6d6d6
| 348953 ||  || — || October 4, 2006 || Mount Lemmon || Mount Lemmon Survey || — || align=right | 3.5 km || 
|-id=954 bgcolor=#d6d6d6
| 348954 ||  || — || October 11, 2006 || Palomar || NEAT || TIR || align=right | 3.7 km || 
|-id=955 bgcolor=#E9E9E9
| 348955 || 2006 UG || — || October 16, 2006 || Desert Moon || B. L. Stevens || JUN || align=right | 3.4 km || 
|-id=956 bgcolor=#d6d6d6
| 348956 ||  || — || October 3, 2006 || Mount Lemmon || Mount Lemmon Survey || — || align=right | 3.4 km || 
|-id=957 bgcolor=#d6d6d6
| 348957 ||  || — || October 16, 2006 || Catalina || CSS || — || align=right | 3.2 km || 
|-id=958 bgcolor=#d6d6d6
| 348958 ||  || — || October 16, 2006 || Kitt Peak || Spacewatch || THM || align=right | 2.6 km || 
|-id=959 bgcolor=#E9E9E9
| 348959 ||  || — || October 16, 2006 || Kitt Peak || Spacewatch || — || align=right | 1.7 km || 
|-id=960 bgcolor=#E9E9E9
| 348960 ||  || — || September 25, 2006 || Mount Lemmon || Mount Lemmon Survey || MRX || align=right data-sort-value="0.92" | 920 m || 
|-id=961 bgcolor=#d6d6d6
| 348961 ||  || — || October 16, 2006 || Kitt Peak || Spacewatch || VER || align=right | 3.2 km || 
|-id=962 bgcolor=#d6d6d6
| 348962 ||  || — || October 16, 2006 || Kitt Peak || Spacewatch || — || align=right | 3.2 km || 
|-id=963 bgcolor=#d6d6d6
| 348963 ||  || — || October 16, 2006 || Kitt Peak || Spacewatch || KAR || align=right | 1.2 km || 
|-id=964 bgcolor=#d6d6d6
| 348964 ||  || — || August 25, 2006 || Lulin || Lulin Obs. || EOS || align=right | 2.1 km || 
|-id=965 bgcolor=#d6d6d6
| 348965 ||  || — || October 17, 2006 || Mount Lemmon || Mount Lemmon Survey || EOS || align=right | 2.3 km || 
|-id=966 bgcolor=#d6d6d6
| 348966 ||  || — || October 19, 2006 || Catalina || CSS || — || align=right | 3.1 km || 
|-id=967 bgcolor=#d6d6d6
| 348967 ||  || — || October 17, 2006 || Kitt Peak || Spacewatch || — || align=right | 5.0 km || 
|-id=968 bgcolor=#d6d6d6
| 348968 ||  || — || October 17, 2006 || Kitt Peak || Spacewatch || — || align=right | 2.6 km || 
|-id=969 bgcolor=#fefefe
| 348969 ||  || — || October 2, 2006 || Mount Lemmon || Mount Lemmon Survey || — || align=right data-sort-value="0.98" | 980 m || 
|-id=970 bgcolor=#d6d6d6
| 348970 ||  || — || October 17, 2006 || Kitt Peak || Spacewatch || — || align=right | 3.0 km || 
|-id=971 bgcolor=#d6d6d6
| 348971 ||  || — || October 17, 2006 || Mount Lemmon || Mount Lemmon Survey || THM || align=right | 2.6 km || 
|-id=972 bgcolor=#d6d6d6
| 348972 ||  || — || October 2, 2006 || Mount Lemmon || Mount Lemmon Survey || — || align=right | 3.0 km || 
|-id=973 bgcolor=#d6d6d6
| 348973 ||  || — || October 18, 2006 || Kitt Peak || Spacewatch || LIX || align=right | 3.9 km || 
|-id=974 bgcolor=#E9E9E9
| 348974 ||  || — || October 3, 2006 || Mount Lemmon || Mount Lemmon Survey || — || align=right | 1.2 km || 
|-id=975 bgcolor=#d6d6d6
| 348975 ||  || — || October 19, 2006 || Kitt Peak || Spacewatch || — || align=right | 3.3 km || 
|-id=976 bgcolor=#d6d6d6
| 348976 ||  || — || October 19, 2006 || Kitt Peak || Spacewatch || — || align=right | 3.4 km || 
|-id=977 bgcolor=#d6d6d6
| 348977 ||  || — || October 11, 2006 || Kitt Peak || Spacewatch || — || align=right | 3.2 km || 
|-id=978 bgcolor=#d6d6d6
| 348978 ||  || — || October 19, 2006 || Kitt Peak || Spacewatch || — || align=right | 4.4 km || 
|-id=979 bgcolor=#E9E9E9
| 348979 ||  || — || September 26, 2006 || Mount Lemmon || Mount Lemmon Survey || — || align=right | 1.3 km || 
|-id=980 bgcolor=#d6d6d6
| 348980 ||  || — || October 19, 2006 || Kitt Peak || Spacewatch || THM || align=right | 2.1 km || 
|-id=981 bgcolor=#d6d6d6
| 348981 ||  || — || October 19, 2006 || Kitt Peak || Spacewatch || — || align=right | 2.2 km || 
|-id=982 bgcolor=#fefefe
| 348982 ||  || — || October 19, 2006 || Kitt Peak || Spacewatch || — || align=right data-sort-value="0.73" | 730 m || 
|-id=983 bgcolor=#d6d6d6
| 348983 ||  || — || October 21, 2006 || Mount Lemmon || Mount Lemmon Survey || KOR || align=right | 1.4 km || 
|-id=984 bgcolor=#d6d6d6
| 348984 ||  || — || October 21, 2006 || Mount Lemmon || Mount Lemmon Survey || EOS || align=right | 1.6 km || 
|-id=985 bgcolor=#d6d6d6
| 348985 ||  || — || October 2, 2006 || Mount Lemmon || Mount Lemmon Survey || — || align=right | 3.4 km || 
|-id=986 bgcolor=#d6d6d6
| 348986 ||  || — || October 21, 2006 || Mount Lemmon || Mount Lemmon Survey || — || align=right | 2.8 km || 
|-id=987 bgcolor=#d6d6d6
| 348987 ||  || — || October 23, 2006 || Catalina || CSS || — || align=right | 3.2 km || 
|-id=988 bgcolor=#d6d6d6
| 348988 ||  || — || October 16, 2006 || Catalina || CSS || — || align=right | 4.5 km || 
|-id=989 bgcolor=#fefefe
| 348989 ||  || — || October 17, 2006 || Catalina || CSS || H || align=right data-sort-value="0.75" | 750 m || 
|-id=990 bgcolor=#fefefe
| 348990 ||  || — || October 19, 2006 || Catalina || CSS || — || align=right data-sort-value="0.93" | 930 m || 
|-id=991 bgcolor=#d6d6d6
| 348991 ||  || — || October 23, 2006 || Catalina || CSS || Tj (2.91) || align=right | 6.8 km || 
|-id=992 bgcolor=#d6d6d6
| 348992 ||  || — || September 17, 2006 || Catalina || CSS || — || align=right | 3.8 km || 
|-id=993 bgcolor=#d6d6d6
| 348993 ||  || — || October 19, 2006 || Catalina || CSS || — || align=right | 3.3 km || 
|-id=994 bgcolor=#d6d6d6
| 348994 ||  || — || October 19, 2006 || Catalina || CSS || — || align=right | 5.1 km || 
|-id=995 bgcolor=#d6d6d6
| 348995 ||  || — || October 19, 2006 || Catalina || CSS || — || align=right | 3.6 km || 
|-id=996 bgcolor=#d6d6d6
| 348996 ||  || — || October 20, 2006 || Kitt Peak || Spacewatch || THM || align=right | 2.1 km || 
|-id=997 bgcolor=#d6d6d6
| 348997 ||  || — || October 20, 2006 || Kitt Peak || Spacewatch || — || align=right | 3.1 km || 
|-id=998 bgcolor=#d6d6d6
| 348998 ||  || — || October 22, 2006 || Palomar || NEAT || MEL || align=right | 4.1 km || 
|-id=999 bgcolor=#d6d6d6
| 348999 ||  || — || October 17, 2006 || Kitt Peak || Spacewatch || — || align=right | 3.1 km || 
|-id=000 bgcolor=#fefefe
| 349000 ||  || — || October 23, 2006 || Mount Lemmon || Mount Lemmon Survey || — || align=right data-sort-value="0.83" | 830 m || 
|}

References

External links 
 Discovery Circumstances: Numbered Minor Planets (345001)–(350000) (IAU Minor Planet Center)

0348